

392001–392100 

|-bgcolor=#E9E9E9
| 392001 ||  || — || December 4, 2008 || Mount Lemmon || Mount Lemmon Survey || — || align=right | 2.5 km || 
|-id=002 bgcolor=#E9E9E9
| 392002 ||  || — || December 30, 2008 || Kitt Peak || Spacewatch || — || align=right | 1.5 km || 
|-id=003 bgcolor=#E9E9E9
| 392003 ||  || — || December 29, 2008 || Kitt Peak || Spacewatch || — || align=right | 2.5 km || 
|-id=004 bgcolor=#E9E9E9
| 392004 ||  || — || December 30, 2008 || Kitt Peak || Spacewatch || HNS || align=right | 1.3 km || 
|-id=005 bgcolor=#E9E9E9
| 392005 ||  || — || December 30, 2008 || Mount Lemmon || Mount Lemmon Survey || — || align=right | 1.4 km || 
|-id=006 bgcolor=#E9E9E9
| 392006 ||  || — || December 30, 2008 || Kitt Peak || Spacewatch || — || align=right | 2.5 km || 
|-id=007 bgcolor=#E9E9E9
| 392007 ||  || — || December 21, 2008 || Kitt Peak || Spacewatch || — || align=right | 2.3 km || 
|-id=008 bgcolor=#E9E9E9
| 392008 ||  || — || December 30, 2008 || Mount Lemmon || Mount Lemmon Survey || — || align=right | 2.2 km || 
|-id=009 bgcolor=#E9E9E9
| 392009 ||  || — || October 11, 2007 || Mount Lemmon || Mount Lemmon Survey || GEF || align=right | 1.4 km || 
|-id=010 bgcolor=#E9E9E9
| 392010 ||  || — || December 21, 2008 || Kitt Peak || Spacewatch || — || align=right | 2.1 km || 
|-id=011 bgcolor=#E9E9E9
| 392011 ||  || — || December 22, 2008 || Mount Lemmon || Mount Lemmon Survey || — || align=right | 1.7 km || 
|-id=012 bgcolor=#E9E9E9
| 392012 ||  || — || January 1, 2009 || Kitt Peak || Spacewatch || GEF || align=right | 1.0 km || 
|-id=013 bgcolor=#E9E9E9
| 392013 ||  || — || January 2, 2009 || Mount Lemmon || Mount Lemmon Survey || JUN || align=right | 1.4 km || 
|-id=014 bgcolor=#E9E9E9
| 392014 ||  || — || January 2, 2009 || Mount Lemmon || Mount Lemmon Survey || — || align=right | 1.8 km || 
|-id=015 bgcolor=#E9E9E9
| 392015 ||  || — || January 2, 2009 || Mount Lemmon || Mount Lemmon Survey || KON || align=right | 2.6 km || 
|-id=016 bgcolor=#E9E9E9
| 392016 ||  || — || December 22, 2008 || Kitt Peak || Spacewatch || MRX || align=right | 1.1 km || 
|-id=017 bgcolor=#E9E9E9
| 392017 ||  || — || January 2, 2009 || Kitt Peak || Spacewatch || — || align=right | 1.5 km || 
|-id=018 bgcolor=#E9E9E9
| 392018 ||  || — || October 24, 2008 || Mount Lemmon || Mount Lemmon Survey || — || align=right | 2.2 km || 
|-id=019 bgcolor=#E9E9E9
| 392019 ||  || — || January 3, 2009 || Mount Lemmon || Mount Lemmon Survey || XIZ || align=right | 1.4 km || 
|-id=020 bgcolor=#d6d6d6
| 392020 ||  || — || December 22, 2008 || Kitt Peak || Spacewatch || — || align=right | 3.5 km || 
|-id=021 bgcolor=#E9E9E9
| 392021 ||  || — || January 1, 2009 || Mount Lemmon || Mount Lemmon Survey || — || align=right | 2.0 km || 
|-id=022 bgcolor=#FA8072
| 392022 ||  || — || June 17, 2005 || Mount Lemmon || Mount Lemmon Survey || — || align=right data-sort-value="0.67" | 670 m || 
|-id=023 bgcolor=#E9E9E9
| 392023 ||  || — || December 21, 2008 || Kitt Peak || Spacewatch || VIB || align=right | 2.0 km || 
|-id=024 bgcolor=#E9E9E9
| 392024 ||  || — || January 20, 2009 || Socorro || LINEAR || DOR || align=right | 2.6 km || 
|-id=025 bgcolor=#E9E9E9
| 392025 ||  || — || December 29, 2008 || Mount Lemmon || Mount Lemmon Survey || AGN || align=right | 1.3 km || 
|-id=026 bgcolor=#E9E9E9
| 392026 ||  || — || January 16, 2009 || Kitt Peak || Spacewatch || — || align=right | 1.6 km || 
|-id=027 bgcolor=#E9E9E9
| 392027 ||  || — || January 16, 2009 || Kitt Peak || Spacewatch || — || align=right | 1.8 km || 
|-id=028 bgcolor=#E9E9E9
| 392028 ||  || — || December 22, 2008 || Kitt Peak || Spacewatch || — || align=right | 2.2 km || 
|-id=029 bgcolor=#E9E9E9
| 392029 ||  || — || January 16, 2009 || Kitt Peak || Spacewatch || — || align=right | 1.8 km || 
|-id=030 bgcolor=#d6d6d6
| 392030 ||  || — || January 16, 2009 || Kitt Peak || Spacewatch || KOR || align=right | 1.1 km || 
|-id=031 bgcolor=#E9E9E9
| 392031 ||  || — || January 16, 2009 || Kitt Peak || Spacewatch || — || align=right | 2.2 km || 
|-id=032 bgcolor=#E9E9E9
| 392032 ||  || — || January 16, 2009 || Kitt Peak || Spacewatch || — || align=right | 1.4 km || 
|-id=033 bgcolor=#E9E9E9
| 392033 ||  || — || January 16, 2009 || Kitt Peak || Spacewatch || — || align=right | 3.1 km || 
|-id=034 bgcolor=#d6d6d6
| 392034 ||  || — || March 29, 2004 || Kitt Peak || Spacewatch || — || align=right | 2.9 km || 
|-id=035 bgcolor=#E9E9E9
| 392035 ||  || — || September 14, 2007 || Mount Lemmon || Mount Lemmon Survey || — || align=right | 1.7 km || 
|-id=036 bgcolor=#d6d6d6
| 392036 ||  || — || January 16, 2009 || Kitt Peak || Spacewatch || CHA || align=right | 2.1 km || 
|-id=037 bgcolor=#E9E9E9
| 392037 ||  || — || January 20, 2009 || Kitt Peak || Spacewatch || — || align=right | 2.2 km || 
|-id=038 bgcolor=#E9E9E9
| 392038 ||  || — || October 8, 2007 || Catalina || CSS || — || align=right | 2.7 km || 
|-id=039 bgcolor=#E9E9E9
| 392039 ||  || — || January 27, 2009 || Purple Mountain || PMO NEO || — || align=right | 3.1 km || 
|-id=040 bgcolor=#d6d6d6
| 392040 ||  || — || January 25, 2009 || Kitt Peak || Spacewatch || — || align=right | 2.7 km || 
|-id=041 bgcolor=#E9E9E9
| 392041 ||  || — || January 25, 2009 || Kitt Peak || Spacewatch || — || align=right | 1.5 km || 
|-id=042 bgcolor=#E9E9E9
| 392042 ||  || — || January 25, 2009 || Kitt Peak || Spacewatch || — || align=right | 1.7 km || 
|-id=043 bgcolor=#E9E9E9
| 392043 ||  || — || December 21, 2003 || Kitt Peak || Spacewatch || — || align=right | 2.3 km || 
|-id=044 bgcolor=#E9E9E9
| 392044 ||  || — || January 24, 2009 || Purple Mountain || PMO NEO || — || align=right | 2.5 km || 
|-id=045 bgcolor=#E9E9E9
| 392045 ||  || — || January 29, 2009 || Mount Lemmon || Mount Lemmon Survey || — || align=right | 2.1 km || 
|-id=046 bgcolor=#E9E9E9
| 392046 ||  || — || January 31, 2009 || Mount Lemmon || Mount Lemmon Survey || — || align=right | 2.4 km || 
|-id=047 bgcolor=#E9E9E9
| 392047 ||  || — || January 31, 2009 || Mount Lemmon || Mount Lemmon Survey || AGN || align=right | 1.2 km || 
|-id=048 bgcolor=#E9E9E9
| 392048 ||  || — || January 29, 2009 || Mount Lemmon || Mount Lemmon Survey || — || align=right | 2.2 km || 
|-id=049 bgcolor=#E9E9E9
| 392049 ||  || — || January 30, 2009 || Kitt Peak || Spacewatch || WIT || align=right data-sort-value="0.89" | 890 m || 
|-id=050 bgcolor=#E9E9E9
| 392050 ||  || — || January 31, 2009 || Kitt Peak || Spacewatch || — || align=right | 1.9 km || 
|-id=051 bgcolor=#E9E9E9
| 392051 ||  || — || April 2, 2005 || Mount Lemmon || Mount Lemmon Survey || AGN || align=right | 1.5 km || 
|-id=052 bgcolor=#E9E9E9
| 392052 ||  || — || January 29, 2009 || Kitt Peak || Spacewatch || — || align=right | 2.3 km || 
|-id=053 bgcolor=#E9E9E9
| 392053 ||  || — || January 30, 2009 || Kitt Peak || Spacewatch || NEM || align=right | 2.1 km || 
|-id=054 bgcolor=#E9E9E9
| 392054 ||  || — || January 31, 2009 || Kitt Peak || Spacewatch || — || align=right | 2.0 km || 
|-id=055 bgcolor=#d6d6d6
| 392055 ||  || — || January 16, 2009 || Kitt Peak || Spacewatch || KOR || align=right | 1.2 km || 
|-id=056 bgcolor=#E9E9E9
| 392056 ||  || — || January 18, 2009 || Mount Lemmon || Mount Lemmon Survey || — || align=right | 1.1 km || 
|-id=057 bgcolor=#d6d6d6
| 392057 ||  || — || January 31, 2009 || Kitt Peak || Spacewatch || EOS || align=right | 1.8 km || 
|-id=058 bgcolor=#E9E9E9
| 392058 ||  || — || January 25, 2009 || Kitt Peak || Spacewatch || CLO || align=right | 2.5 km || 
|-id=059 bgcolor=#E9E9E9
| 392059 ||  || — || January 18, 2009 || Kitt Peak || Spacewatch || WIT || align=right | 1.1 km || 
|-id=060 bgcolor=#d6d6d6
| 392060 ||  || — || January 17, 2009 || Kitt Peak || Spacewatch || — || align=right | 2.6 km || 
|-id=061 bgcolor=#E9E9E9
| 392061 ||  || — || March 10, 2005 || Catalina || CSS || — || align=right | 2.2 km || 
|-id=062 bgcolor=#E9E9E9
| 392062 ||  || — || January 17, 2009 || Kitt Peak || Spacewatch || — || align=right | 2.3 km || 
|-id=063 bgcolor=#E9E9E9
| 392063 ||  || — || January 20, 2009 || Socorro || LINEAR || — || align=right | 1.7 km || 
|-id=064 bgcolor=#E9E9E9
| 392064 ||  || — || February 1, 2009 || Kitt Peak || Spacewatch || — || align=right | 2.3 km || 
|-id=065 bgcolor=#E9E9E9
| 392065 ||  || — || February 2, 2009 || Mount Lemmon || Mount Lemmon Survey || — || align=right | 3.1 km || 
|-id=066 bgcolor=#E9E9E9
| 392066 ||  || — || December 1, 2008 || Mount Lemmon || Mount Lemmon Survey || — || align=right | 1.9 km || 
|-id=067 bgcolor=#E9E9E9
| 392067 ||  || — || February 4, 2009 || Mount Lemmon || Mount Lemmon Survey || — || align=right | 1.8 km || 
|-id=068 bgcolor=#E9E9E9
| 392068 ||  || — || February 13, 2009 || Kitt Peak || Spacewatch || — || align=right | 2.0 km || 
|-id=069 bgcolor=#E9E9E9
| 392069 ||  || — || February 13, 2009 || Kitt Peak || Spacewatch || — || align=right | 2.1 km || 
|-id=070 bgcolor=#E9E9E9
| 392070 ||  || — || February 14, 2009 || La Sagra || OAM Obs. || — || align=right | 1.8 km || 
|-id=071 bgcolor=#d6d6d6
| 392071 ||  || — || November 5, 2007 || Kitt Peak || Spacewatch || — || align=right | 2.0 km || 
|-id=072 bgcolor=#d6d6d6
| 392072 ||  || — || February 4, 2009 || Mount Lemmon || Mount Lemmon Survey || — || align=right | 3.6 km || 
|-id=073 bgcolor=#E9E9E9
| 392073 ||  || — || February 17, 2009 || Kitt Peak || Spacewatch || NEM || align=right | 1.9 km || 
|-id=074 bgcolor=#E9E9E9
| 392074 ||  || — || February 17, 2009 || Socorro || LINEAR || — || align=right | 2.8 km || 
|-id=075 bgcolor=#E9E9E9
| 392075 ||  || — || January 19, 2009 || Mount Lemmon || Mount Lemmon Survey || HNA || align=right | 2.3 km || 
|-id=076 bgcolor=#E9E9E9
| 392076 ||  || — || January 25, 2009 || Kitt Peak || Spacewatch || WIT || align=right | 1.2 km || 
|-id=077 bgcolor=#E9E9E9
| 392077 ||  || — || February 22, 2009 || Calar Alto || F. Hormuth || — || align=right | 1.8 km || 
|-id=078 bgcolor=#E9E9E9
| 392078 ||  || — || February 20, 2009 || Kitt Peak || Spacewatch || — || align=right | 2.4 km || 
|-id=079 bgcolor=#d6d6d6
| 392079 ||  || — || February 20, 2009 || Kitt Peak || Spacewatch || TRE || align=right | 4.1 km || 
|-id=080 bgcolor=#d6d6d6
| 392080 ||  || — || February 20, 2009 || Kitt Peak || Spacewatch || — || align=right | 3.0 km || 
|-id=081 bgcolor=#E9E9E9
| 392081 ||  || — || January 29, 2009 || Catalina || CSS || — || align=right | 2.3 km || 
|-id=082 bgcolor=#E9E9E9
| 392082 ||  || — || February 26, 2009 || Socorro || LINEAR || DOR || align=right | 3.1 km || 
|-id=083 bgcolor=#d6d6d6
| 392083 ||  || — || February 22, 2009 || Kitt Peak || Spacewatch || — || align=right | 3.7 km || 
|-id=084 bgcolor=#E9E9E9
| 392084 ||  || — || February 22, 2009 || Kitt Peak || Spacewatch || — || align=right | 2.7 km || 
|-id=085 bgcolor=#d6d6d6
| 392085 ||  || — || January 30, 2009 || Mount Lemmon || Mount Lemmon Survey || — || align=right | 2.7 km || 
|-id=086 bgcolor=#E9E9E9
| 392086 ||  || — || February 20, 2009 || Kitt Peak || Spacewatch || — || align=right | 4.0 km || 
|-id=087 bgcolor=#E9E9E9
| 392087 ||  || — || February 3, 2009 || Mount Lemmon || Mount Lemmon Survey || — || align=right | 2.7 km || 
|-id=088 bgcolor=#E9E9E9
| 392088 ||  || — || February 22, 2009 || Mount Lemmon || Mount Lemmon Survey || MRX || align=right | 1.1 km || 
|-id=089 bgcolor=#d6d6d6
| 392089 ||  || — || February 27, 2009 || Kitt Peak || Spacewatch || — || align=right | 2.1 km || 
|-id=090 bgcolor=#E9E9E9
| 392090 ||  || — || February 26, 2009 || Kitt Peak || Spacewatch || AGN || align=right | 1.2 km || 
|-id=091 bgcolor=#d6d6d6
| 392091 ||  || — || October 1, 2000 || Socorro || LINEAR || — || align=right | 3.9 km || 
|-id=092 bgcolor=#d6d6d6
| 392092 ||  || — || February 26, 2009 || Kitt Peak || Spacewatch || BRA || align=right | 1.8 km || 
|-id=093 bgcolor=#E9E9E9
| 392093 ||  || — || February 24, 2009 || Mount Lemmon || Mount Lemmon Survey || DOR || align=right | 2.6 km || 
|-id=094 bgcolor=#E9E9E9
| 392094 ||  || — || February 19, 2009 || Catalina || CSS || DOR || align=right | 2.8 km || 
|-id=095 bgcolor=#E9E9E9
| 392095 ||  || — || February 27, 2009 || Kitt Peak || Spacewatch || — || align=right | 2.3 km || 
|-id=096 bgcolor=#d6d6d6
| 392096 ||  || — || February 27, 2009 || Kitt Peak || Spacewatch || — || align=right | 2.8 km || 
|-id=097 bgcolor=#E9E9E9
| 392097 ||  || — || February 20, 2009 || Kitt Peak || Spacewatch || AGN || align=right | 1.3 km || 
|-id=098 bgcolor=#E9E9E9
| 392098 ||  || — || February 27, 2009 || Kitt Peak || Spacewatch || — || align=right | 2.6 km || 
|-id=099 bgcolor=#E9E9E9
| 392099 ||  || — || February 28, 2009 || Kitt Peak || Spacewatch || HOF || align=right | 2.8 km || 
|-id=100 bgcolor=#d6d6d6
| 392100 ||  || — || February 20, 2009 || Kitt Peak || Spacewatch || — || align=right | 2.4 km || 
|}

392101–392200 

|-bgcolor=#E9E9E9
| 392101 ||  || — || February 27, 2009 || Mount Lemmon || Mount Lemmon Survey || GEF || align=right | 1.3 km || 
|-id=102 bgcolor=#d6d6d6
| 392102 ||  || — || February 20, 2009 || Kitt Peak || Spacewatch || — || align=right | 3.7 km || 
|-id=103 bgcolor=#d6d6d6
| 392103 ||  || — || February 27, 2009 || Kitt Peak || Spacewatch || — || align=right | 2.8 km || 
|-id=104 bgcolor=#fefefe
| 392104 ||  || — || February 19, 2009 || Catalina || CSS || H || align=right data-sort-value="0.62" | 620 m || 
|-id=105 bgcolor=#d6d6d6
| 392105 ||  || — || February 22, 2009 || Kitt Peak || Spacewatch || EMA || align=right | 3.0 km || 
|-id=106 bgcolor=#E9E9E9
| 392106 ||  || — || March 15, 2009 || La Sagra || OAM Obs. || — || align=right | 2.5 km || 
|-id=107 bgcolor=#E9E9E9
| 392107 ||  || — || March 2, 2009 || Kitt Peak || Spacewatch || — || align=right | 2.4 km || 
|-id=108 bgcolor=#d6d6d6
| 392108 ||  || — || December 30, 2008 || Mount Lemmon || Mount Lemmon Survey || — || align=right | 3.4 km || 
|-id=109 bgcolor=#d6d6d6
| 392109 ||  || — || March 15, 2009 || La Sagra || OAM Obs. || KOR || align=right | 1.8 km || 
|-id=110 bgcolor=#fefefe
| 392110 ||  || — || March 3, 2009 || Catalina || CSS || H || align=right data-sort-value="0.85" | 850 m || 
|-id=111 bgcolor=#E9E9E9
| 392111 ||  || — || March 3, 2009 || Kitt Peak || Spacewatch || — || align=right | 2.5 km || 
|-id=112 bgcolor=#d6d6d6
| 392112 ||  || — || January 31, 2009 || Mount Lemmon || Mount Lemmon Survey || — || align=right | 2.4 km || 
|-id=113 bgcolor=#d6d6d6
| 392113 ||  || — || March 2, 2009 || Kitt Peak || Spacewatch || TIR || align=right | 2.9 km || 
|-id=114 bgcolor=#d6d6d6
| 392114 ||  || — || March 16, 2009 || Kitt Peak || Spacewatch || — || align=right | 2.4 km || 
|-id=115 bgcolor=#FA8072
| 392115 ||  || — || March 17, 2009 || Catalina || CSS || H || align=right data-sort-value="0.64" | 640 m || 
|-id=116 bgcolor=#E9E9E9
| 392116 ||  || — || March 18, 2009 || La Sagra || OAM Obs. || DOR || align=right | 2.6 km || 
|-id=117 bgcolor=#E9E9E9
| 392117 ||  || — || February 11, 2004 || Kitt Peak || Spacewatch || — || align=right | 2.9 km || 
|-id=118 bgcolor=#d6d6d6
| 392118 ||  || — || March 19, 2009 || Kitt Peak || Spacewatch || — || align=right | 2.3 km || 
|-id=119 bgcolor=#d6d6d6
| 392119 ||  || — || March 22, 2009 || Catalina || CSS || — || align=right | 3.4 km || 
|-id=120 bgcolor=#fefefe
| 392120 Heidiursula ||  ||  || March 18, 2009 || Zadko || M. Todd || H || align=right data-sort-value="0.63" | 630 m || 
|-id=121 bgcolor=#d6d6d6
| 392121 ||  || — || March 23, 2004 || Kitt Peak || Spacewatch || — || align=right | 2.9 km || 
|-id=122 bgcolor=#E9E9E9
| 392122 ||  || — || March 26, 2009 || Kitt Peak || Spacewatch || — || align=right | 2.4 km || 
|-id=123 bgcolor=#d6d6d6
| 392123 ||  || — || March 16, 2009 || Purple Mountain || PMO NEO || EUP || align=right | 3.1 km || 
|-id=124 bgcolor=#d6d6d6
| 392124 ||  || — || March 18, 2009 || Mount Lemmon || Mount Lemmon Survey || FIR || align=right | 2.8 km || 
|-id=125 bgcolor=#d6d6d6
| 392125 ||  || — || March 27, 2009 || Kitt Peak || Spacewatch || — || align=right | 2.4 km || 
|-id=126 bgcolor=#d6d6d6
| 392126 ||  || — || February 17, 2004 || Kitt Peak || Spacewatch || BRA || align=right | 1.6 km || 
|-id=127 bgcolor=#fefefe
| 392127 ||  || — || March 18, 2009 || Catalina || CSS || H || align=right | 1.0 km || 
|-id=128 bgcolor=#d6d6d6
| 392128 ||  || — || March 18, 2009 || Mount Lemmon || Mount Lemmon Survey || — || align=right | 2.0 km || 
|-id=129 bgcolor=#d6d6d6
| 392129 ||  || — || March 29, 2009 || Kitt Peak || Spacewatch || — || align=right | 2.7 km || 
|-id=130 bgcolor=#d6d6d6
| 392130 ||  || — || March 16, 2009 || Kitt Peak || Spacewatch || — || align=right | 4.0 km || 
|-id=131 bgcolor=#d6d6d6
| 392131 ||  || — || March 16, 2009 || Kitt Peak || Spacewatch || — || align=right | 3.2 km || 
|-id=132 bgcolor=#d6d6d6
| 392132 ||  || — || March 30, 2009 || Mount Lemmon || Mount Lemmon Survey || — || align=right | 4.1 km || 
|-id=133 bgcolor=#d6d6d6
| 392133 ||  || — || March 17, 2009 || Kitt Peak || Spacewatch || — || align=right | 3.1 km || 
|-id=134 bgcolor=#d6d6d6
| 392134 ||  || — || September 26, 2006 || Mount Lemmon || Mount Lemmon Survey || — || align=right | 2.9 km || 
|-id=135 bgcolor=#d6d6d6
| 392135 ||  || — || January 19, 2008 || Mount Lemmon || Mount Lemmon Survey || — || align=right | 3.8 km || 
|-id=136 bgcolor=#d6d6d6
| 392136 ||  || — || April 1, 2009 || Mount Lemmon || Mount Lemmon Survey || THM || align=right | 2.4 km || 
|-id=137 bgcolor=#d6d6d6
| 392137 ||  || — || April 16, 2009 || Catalina || CSS || — || align=right | 3.4 km || 
|-id=138 bgcolor=#d6d6d6
| 392138 ||  || — || March 29, 2009 || Kitt Peak || Spacewatch || — || align=right | 2.3 km || 
|-id=139 bgcolor=#fefefe
| 392139 ||  || — || April 17, 2009 || Catalina || CSS || H || align=right data-sort-value="0.86" | 860 m || 
|-id=140 bgcolor=#d6d6d6
| 392140 ||  || — || April 18, 2009 || Mount Lemmon || Mount Lemmon Survey || EOS || align=right | 1.7 km || 
|-id=141 bgcolor=#d6d6d6
| 392141 ||  || — || January 19, 2009 || Mount Lemmon || Mount Lemmon Survey || — || align=right | 3.6 km || 
|-id=142 bgcolor=#d6d6d6
| 392142 Solheim ||  ||  || April 16, 2009 || Baldone || K. Černis, I. Eglītis || — || align=right | 2.9 km || 
|-id=143 bgcolor=#d6d6d6
| 392143 ||  || — || April 18, 2009 || Kitt Peak || Spacewatch || THM || align=right | 2.5 km || 
|-id=144 bgcolor=#d6d6d6
| 392144 ||  || — || January 30, 2008 || Mount Lemmon || Mount Lemmon Survey || HYG || align=right | 2.6 km || 
|-id=145 bgcolor=#fefefe
| 392145 ||  || — || February 24, 2009 || Mount Lemmon || Mount Lemmon Survey || H || align=right data-sort-value="0.65" | 650 m || 
|-id=146 bgcolor=#d6d6d6
| 392146 ||  || — || April 18, 2009 || Kitt Peak || Spacewatch || EOS || align=right | 1.8 km || 
|-id=147 bgcolor=#d6d6d6
| 392147 ||  || — || April 18, 2009 || Kitt Peak || Spacewatch || — || align=right | 2.9 km || 
|-id=148 bgcolor=#d6d6d6
| 392148 ||  || — || April 18, 2009 || Kitt Peak || Spacewatch || — || align=right | 2.7 km || 
|-id=149 bgcolor=#d6d6d6
| 392149 ||  || — || April 20, 2009 || Kitt Peak || Spacewatch || — || align=right | 3.1 km || 
|-id=150 bgcolor=#d6d6d6
| 392150 ||  || — || April 21, 2009 || Kitt Peak || Spacewatch || LAU || align=right data-sort-value="0.96" | 960 m || 
|-id=151 bgcolor=#d6d6d6
| 392151 ||  || — || April 21, 2009 || Kitt Peak || Spacewatch || — || align=right | 2.5 km || 
|-id=152 bgcolor=#d6d6d6
| 392152 ||  || — || April 23, 2009 || Kitt Peak || Spacewatch || — || align=right | 3.0 km || 
|-id=153 bgcolor=#d6d6d6
| 392153 ||  || — || April 18, 2009 || Kitt Peak || Spacewatch || — || align=right | 3.1 km || 
|-id=154 bgcolor=#d6d6d6
| 392154 ||  || — || April 26, 2009 || Mount Lemmon || Mount Lemmon Survey || — || align=right | 3.7 km || 
|-id=155 bgcolor=#d6d6d6
| 392155 ||  || — || March 21, 2009 || Kitt Peak || Spacewatch || — || align=right | 2.1 km || 
|-id=156 bgcolor=#d6d6d6
| 392156 ||  || — || March 24, 2009 || Mount Lemmon || Mount Lemmon Survey || EOS || align=right | 1.9 km || 
|-id=157 bgcolor=#d6d6d6
| 392157 ||  || — || March 1, 2009 || Mount Lemmon || Mount Lemmon Survey || — || align=right | 3.8 km || 
|-id=158 bgcolor=#fefefe
| 392158 ||  || — || April 30, 2009 || Kitt Peak || Spacewatch || H || align=right data-sort-value="0.77" | 770 m || 
|-id=159 bgcolor=#d6d6d6
| 392159 ||  || — || April 17, 2009 || Kitt Peak || Spacewatch || — || align=right | 3.1 km || 
|-id=160 bgcolor=#d6d6d6
| 392160 ||  || — || April 20, 2009 || Mount Lemmon || Mount Lemmon Survey || — || align=right | 2.4 km || 
|-id=161 bgcolor=#d6d6d6
| 392161 ||  || — || April 21, 2009 || Kitt Peak || Spacewatch || EOS || align=right | 2.1 km || 
|-id=162 bgcolor=#d6d6d6
| 392162 ||  || — || April 29, 2009 || Kitt Peak || Spacewatch || — || align=right | 2.3 km || 
|-id=163 bgcolor=#d6d6d6
| 392163 ||  || — || April 27, 2009 || Kitt Peak || Spacewatch || — || align=right | 1.8 km || 
|-id=164 bgcolor=#d6d6d6
| 392164 ||  || — || May 6, 2009 || La Sagra || OAM Obs. || ALA || align=right | 4.8 km || 
|-id=165 bgcolor=#d6d6d6
| 392165 ||  || — || April 18, 2009 || Kitt Peak || Spacewatch || — || align=right | 3.1 km || 
|-id=166 bgcolor=#FA8072
| 392166 ||  || — || May 13, 2009 || Kitt Peak || Spacewatch || H || align=right data-sort-value="0.56" | 560 m || 
|-id=167 bgcolor=#d6d6d6
| 392167 ||  || — || May 13, 2009 || Mount Lemmon || Mount Lemmon Survey || — || align=right | 3.0 km || 
|-id=168 bgcolor=#d6d6d6
| 392168 ||  || — || March 24, 2009 || Mount Lemmon || Mount Lemmon Survey || NAE || align=right | 2.4 km || 
|-id=169 bgcolor=#d6d6d6
| 392169 ||  || — || May 15, 2009 || Kitt Peak || Spacewatch || — || align=right | 2.8 km || 
|-id=170 bgcolor=#d6d6d6
| 392170 ||  || — || May 1, 2009 || Kitt Peak || Spacewatch || EMA || align=right | 4.0 km || 
|-id=171 bgcolor=#d6d6d6
| 392171 ||  || — || May 17, 2009 || Dauban || F. Kugel || — || align=right | 3.7 km || 
|-id=172 bgcolor=#d6d6d6
| 392172 ||  || — || April 20, 2009 || Kitt Peak || Spacewatch || — || align=right | 3.2 km || 
|-id=173 bgcolor=#d6d6d6
| 392173 ||  || — || May 25, 2009 || Mount Lemmon || Mount Lemmon Survey || — || align=right | 3.5 km || 
|-id=174 bgcolor=#d6d6d6
| 392174 ||  || — || April 30, 2009 || Kitt Peak || Spacewatch || EOS || align=right | 2.0 km || 
|-id=175 bgcolor=#d6d6d6
| 392175 ||  || — || May 26, 2009 || Kitt Peak || Spacewatch || — || align=right | 4.6 km || 
|-id=176 bgcolor=#d6d6d6
| 392176 ||  || — || April 17, 2009 || Mount Lemmon || Mount Lemmon Survey || — || align=right | 4.6 km || 
|-id=177 bgcolor=#d6d6d6
| 392177 ||  || — || May 28, 2009 || Kitt Peak || Spacewatch || URS || align=right | 5.1 km || 
|-id=178 bgcolor=#d6d6d6
| 392178 ||  || — || May 28, 2009 || Kitt Peak || Spacewatch || — || align=right | 4.7 km || 
|-id=179 bgcolor=#d6d6d6
| 392179 ||  || — || June 12, 2009 || Kitt Peak || Spacewatch || — || align=right | 2.7 km || 
|-id=180 bgcolor=#fefefe
| 392180 ||  || — || June 1, 2009 || Catalina || CSS || H || align=right data-sort-value="0.50" | 500 m || 
|-id=181 bgcolor=#d6d6d6
| 392181 ||  || — || June 1, 2009 || Mount Lemmon || Mount Lemmon Survey || — || align=right | 3.2 km || 
|-id=182 bgcolor=#d6d6d6
| 392182 || 2009 MG || — || June 17, 2009 || Skylive Obs. || F. Tozzi || — || align=right | 3.2 km || 
|-id=183 bgcolor=#d6d6d6
| 392183 || 2009 PA || — || August 1, 2009 || Siding Spring || SSS || 7:4* || align=right | 4.8 km || 
|-id=184 bgcolor=#fefefe
| 392184 ||  || — || October 19, 1998 || Kitt Peak || Spacewatch || MAS || align=right data-sort-value="0.65" | 650 m || 
|-id=185 bgcolor=#fefefe
| 392185 ||  || — || February 9, 2008 || Catalina || CSS || H || align=right data-sort-value="0.66" | 660 m || 
|-id=186 bgcolor=#d6d6d6
| 392186 ||  || — || April 8, 2008 || Catalina || CSS || EUP || align=right | 3.5 km || 
|-id=187 bgcolor=#fefefe
| 392187 ||  || — || August 20, 2009 || Kitt Peak || Spacewatch || MAS || align=right data-sort-value="0.62" | 620 m || 
|-id=188 bgcolor=#C2FFFF
| 392188 ||  || — || September 15, 2009 || Kitt Peak || Spacewatch || L4 || align=right | 7.6 km || 
|-id=189 bgcolor=#C2FFFF
| 392189 ||  || — || September 16, 2009 || Kitt Peak || Spacewatch || L4006 || align=right | 11 km || 
|-id=190 bgcolor=#fefefe
| 392190 ||  || — || September 17, 2009 || Kitt Peak || Spacewatch || FLO || align=right data-sort-value="0.52" | 520 m || 
|-id=191 bgcolor=#fefefe
| 392191 ||  || — || September 17, 2009 || Kitt Peak || Spacewatch || FLO || align=right data-sort-value="0.81" | 810 m || 
|-id=192 bgcolor=#C2FFFF
| 392192 ||  || — || September 17, 2009 || Kitt Peak || Spacewatch || L4 || align=right | 8.0 km || 
|-id=193 bgcolor=#C2FFFF
| 392193 ||  || — || September 18, 2009 || Kitt Peak || Spacewatch || L4 || align=right | 9.1 km || 
|-id=194 bgcolor=#fefefe
| 392194 ||  || — || September 18, 2009 || Kitt Peak || Spacewatch || FLO || align=right data-sort-value="0.57" | 570 m || 
|-id=195 bgcolor=#C2FFFF
| 392195 ||  || — || September 15, 2009 || Kitt Peak || Spacewatch || L4 || align=right | 8.2 km || 
|-id=196 bgcolor=#C2FFFF
| 392196 ||  || — || September 15, 2009 || Kitt Peak || Spacewatch || L4 || align=right | 8.9 km || 
|-id=197 bgcolor=#C2FFFF
| 392197 ||  || — || September 21, 2009 || Kitt Peak || Spacewatch || L4 || align=right | 10 km || 
|-id=198 bgcolor=#C2FFFF
| 392198 ||  || — || September 26, 2008 || Mount Lemmon || Mount Lemmon Survey || L4 || align=right | 9.2 km || 
|-id=199 bgcolor=#C2FFFF
| 392199 ||  || — || September 23, 2009 || Kitt Peak || Spacewatch || L4 || align=right | 9.2 km || 
|-id=200 bgcolor=#C2FFFF
| 392200 ||  || — || September 16, 2009 || Kitt Peak || Spacewatch || L4 || align=right | 7.2 km || 
|}

392201–392300 

|-bgcolor=#C2FFFF
| 392201 ||  || — || September 21, 2009 || Mount Lemmon || Mount Lemmon Survey || L4 || align=right | 7.9 km || 
|-id=202 bgcolor=#C2FFFF
| 392202 ||  || — || September 23, 2009 || Mount Lemmon || Mount Lemmon Survey || L4 || align=right | 7.2 km || 
|-id=203 bgcolor=#d6d6d6
| 392203 ||  || — || September 26, 2009 || Kitt Peak || Spacewatch || HIL3:2 || align=right | 6.9 km || 
|-id=204 bgcolor=#C2FFFF
| 392204 ||  || — || September 15, 2009 || Kitt Peak || Spacewatch || L4 || align=right | 8.9 km || 
|-id=205 bgcolor=#C2FFFF
| 392205 ||  || — || September 17, 2009 || Kitt Peak || Spacewatch || L4 || align=right | 9.5 km || 
|-id=206 bgcolor=#C2FFFF
| 392206 ||  || — || September 16, 2009 || Kitt Peak || Spacewatch || L4ERY || align=right | 7.2 km || 
|-id=207 bgcolor=#C2FFFF
| 392207 ||  || — || February 14, 2002 || Kitt Peak || Spacewatch || L4 || align=right | 9.9 km || 
|-id=208 bgcolor=#C2FFFF
| 392208 ||  || — || September 21, 2009 || Kitt Peak || Spacewatch || L4 || align=right | 7.4 km || 
|-id=209 bgcolor=#C2FFFF
| 392209 ||  || — || September 25, 2009 || Kitt Peak || Spacewatch || L4 || align=right | 7.6 km || 
|-id=210 bgcolor=#C2FFFF
| 392210 ||  || — || September 18, 2009 || Kitt Peak || Spacewatch || L4 || align=right | 7.4 km || 
|-id=211 bgcolor=#FFC2E0
| 392211 ||  || — || October 15, 2009 || Mount Lemmon || Mount Lemmon Survey || AMO +1km || align=right | 1.1 km || 
|-id=212 bgcolor=#fefefe
| 392212 ||  || — || October 23, 2006 || Mount Lemmon || Mount Lemmon Survey || — || align=right data-sort-value="0.67" | 670 m || 
|-id=213 bgcolor=#fefefe
| 392213 ||  || — || October 20, 2006 || Mount Lemmon || Mount Lemmon Survey || — || align=right data-sort-value="0.59" | 590 m || 
|-id=214 bgcolor=#FA8072
| 392214 ||  || — || October 24, 2009 || Hibiscus || N. Teamo || — || align=right | 1.0 km || 
|-id=215 bgcolor=#fefefe
| 392215 ||  || — || October 18, 2009 || Mount Lemmon || Mount Lemmon Survey || — || align=right data-sort-value="0.71" | 710 m || 
|-id=216 bgcolor=#C2FFFF
| 392216 ||  || — || October 18, 2009 || Mount Lemmon || Mount Lemmon Survey || L4 || align=right | 9.7 km || 
|-id=217 bgcolor=#C2FFFF
| 392217 ||  || — || October 18, 2009 || Mount Lemmon || Mount Lemmon Survey || L4 || align=right | 9.0 km || 
|-id=218 bgcolor=#fefefe
| 392218 ||  || — || October 18, 2009 || Catalina || CSS || — || align=right data-sort-value="0.74" | 740 m || 
|-id=219 bgcolor=#C2FFFF
| 392219 ||  || — || September 24, 2008 || Mount Lemmon || Mount Lemmon Survey || L4 || align=right | 7.8 km || 
|-id=220 bgcolor=#C2FFFF
| 392220 ||  || — || October 7, 2008 || Mount Lemmon || Mount Lemmon Survey || L4 || align=right | 9.5 km || 
|-id=221 bgcolor=#C2FFFF
| 392221 ||  || — || September 15, 2009 || Kitt Peak || Spacewatch || L4 || align=right | 8.3 km || 
|-id=222 bgcolor=#C2FFFF
| 392222 ||  || — || October 23, 2009 || Mount Lemmon || Mount Lemmon Survey || L4 || align=right | 8.9 km || 
|-id=223 bgcolor=#C2FFFF
| 392223 ||  || — || October 24, 2009 || Mount Lemmon || Mount Lemmon Survey || L4 || align=right | 6.9 km || 
|-id=224 bgcolor=#C2FFFF
| 392224 ||  || — || October 7, 2008 || Mount Lemmon || Mount Lemmon Survey || L4 || align=right | 12 km || 
|-id=225 bgcolor=#fefefe
| 392225 Lanzarote ||  ||  || October 29, 2009 || Nazaret || G. Muler, J. M. Ruiz || FLO || align=right data-sort-value="0.63" | 630 m || 
|-id=226 bgcolor=#C2FFFF
| 392226 ||  || — || November 1, 1997 || Kitt Peak || Spacewatch || L4 || align=right | 11 km || 
|-id=227 bgcolor=#C2FFFF
| 392227 ||  || — || November 8, 2009 || Mount Lemmon || Mount Lemmon Survey || L4ERY || align=right | 6.8 km || 
|-id=228 bgcolor=#fefefe
| 392228 ||  || — || September 21, 2009 || Mount Lemmon || Mount Lemmon Survey || — || align=right data-sort-value="0.81" | 810 m || 
|-id=229 bgcolor=#fefefe
| 392229 ||  || — || November 9, 2009 || Mount Lemmon || Mount Lemmon Survey || — || align=right | 1.4 km || 
|-id=230 bgcolor=#fefefe
| 392230 ||  || — || November 13, 2009 || La Sagra || OAM Obs. || ERI || align=right | 2.1 km || 
|-id=231 bgcolor=#fefefe
| 392231 ||  || — || September 22, 2009 || Mount Lemmon || Mount Lemmon Survey || — || align=right data-sort-value="0.62" | 620 m || 
|-id=232 bgcolor=#fefefe
| 392232 ||  || — || February 25, 2007 || Mount Lemmon || Mount Lemmon Survey || — || align=right data-sort-value="0.91" | 910 m || 
|-id=233 bgcolor=#fefefe
| 392233 ||  || — || October 6, 1996 || Kitt Peak || Spacewatch || — || align=right data-sort-value="0.60" | 600 m || 
|-id=234 bgcolor=#fefefe
| 392234 ||  || — || November 15, 2009 || Catalina || CSS || NYS || align=right | 1.3 km || 
|-id=235 bgcolor=#E9E9E9
| 392235 ||  || — || August 17, 2009 || Catalina || CSS || JUN || align=right | 1.4 km || 
|-id=236 bgcolor=#d6d6d6
| 392236 ||  || — || January 26, 2006 || Mount Lemmon || Mount Lemmon Survey || — || align=right | 2.3 km || 
|-id=237 bgcolor=#fefefe
| 392237 ||  || — || November 9, 2009 || Mount Lemmon || Mount Lemmon Survey || — || align=right data-sort-value="0.68" | 680 m || 
|-id=238 bgcolor=#C2FFFF
| 392238 ||  || — || September 26, 2009 || Kitt Peak || Spacewatch || L4 || align=right | 8.0 km || 
|-id=239 bgcolor=#C2FFFF
| 392239 ||  || — || November 16, 2009 || Mount Lemmon || Mount Lemmon Survey || L4ERY || align=right | 7.4 km || 
|-id=240 bgcolor=#fefefe
| 392240 ||  || — || November 17, 2009 || Mount Lemmon || Mount Lemmon Survey || NYS || align=right data-sort-value="0.84" | 840 m || 
|-id=241 bgcolor=#fefefe
| 392241 ||  || — || November 16, 2009 || Kitt Peak || Spacewatch || — || align=right data-sort-value="0.84" | 840 m || 
|-id=242 bgcolor=#C2FFFF
| 392242 ||  || — || November 17, 2009 || Kitt Peak || Spacewatch || L4 || align=right | 7.4 km || 
|-id=243 bgcolor=#fefefe
| 392243 ||  || — || November 17, 2009 || Mount Lemmon || Mount Lemmon Survey || — || align=right | 1.3 km || 
|-id=244 bgcolor=#fefefe
| 392244 ||  || — || November 18, 2009 || Kitt Peak || Spacewatch || NYS || align=right data-sort-value="0.60" | 600 m || 
|-id=245 bgcolor=#fefefe
| 392245 ||  || — || December 24, 2006 || Kitt Peak || Spacewatch || — || align=right data-sort-value="0.82" | 820 m || 
|-id=246 bgcolor=#C2FFFF
| 392246 ||  || — || October 8, 2008 || Kitt Peak || Spacewatch || L4 || align=right | 7.8 km || 
|-id=247 bgcolor=#fefefe
| 392247 ||  || — || November 20, 2009 || Kitt Peak || Spacewatch || — || align=right data-sort-value="0.52" | 520 m || 
|-id=248 bgcolor=#fefefe
| 392248 ||  || — || November 22, 2009 || Mount Lemmon || Mount Lemmon Survey || FLO || align=right data-sort-value="0.51" | 510 m || 
|-id=249 bgcolor=#fefefe
| 392249 ||  || — || November 21, 2009 || Kitt Peak || Spacewatch || — || align=right data-sort-value="0.68" | 680 m || 
|-id=250 bgcolor=#fefefe
| 392250 ||  || — || November 22, 2009 || Kitt Peak || Spacewatch || NYS || align=right data-sort-value="0.67" | 670 m || 
|-id=251 bgcolor=#fefefe
| 392251 ||  || — || November 22, 2009 || Mount Lemmon || Mount Lemmon Survey || — || align=right data-sort-value="0.57" | 570 m || 
|-id=252 bgcolor=#fefefe
| 392252 ||  || — || November 8, 2009 || Kitt Peak || Spacewatch || FLO || align=right data-sort-value="0.62" | 620 m || 
|-id=253 bgcolor=#fefefe
| 392253 ||  || — || January 27, 2007 || Mount Lemmon || Mount Lemmon Survey || — || align=right | 1.7 km || 
|-id=254 bgcolor=#fefefe
| 392254 ||  || — || January 10, 2007 || Kitt Peak || Spacewatch || FLO || align=right data-sort-value="0.56" | 560 m || 
|-id=255 bgcolor=#fefefe
| 392255 ||  || — || September 15, 2009 || Kitt Peak || Spacewatch || — || align=right data-sort-value="0.87" | 870 m || 
|-id=256 bgcolor=#fefefe
| 392256 ||  || — || November 18, 2009 || Mount Lemmon || Mount Lemmon Survey || — || align=right data-sort-value="0.94" | 940 m || 
|-id=257 bgcolor=#fefefe
| 392257 ||  || — || November 21, 2009 || Mount Lemmon || Mount Lemmon Survey || — || align=right data-sort-value="0.66" | 660 m || 
|-id=258 bgcolor=#fefefe
| 392258 ||  || — || December 15, 2009 || Mount Lemmon || Mount Lemmon Survey || — || align=right data-sort-value="0.96" | 960 m || 
|-id=259 bgcolor=#fefefe
| 392259 ||  || — || December 19, 2009 || Mount Lemmon || Mount Lemmon Survey || ERI || align=right | 1.4 km || 
|-id=260 bgcolor=#fefefe
| 392260 ||  || — || December 21, 2009 || Hibiscus || N. Teamo || — || align=right data-sort-value="0.72" | 720 m || 
|-id=261 bgcolor=#fefefe
| 392261 ||  || — || December 17, 2009 || Mount Lemmon || Mount Lemmon Survey || — || align=right | 2.3 km || 
|-id=262 bgcolor=#fefefe
| 392262 ||  || — || December 19, 2009 || Kitt Peak || Spacewatch || NYS || align=right data-sort-value="0.61" | 610 m || 
|-id=263 bgcolor=#fefefe
| 392263 ||  || — || September 25, 2008 || Mount Lemmon || Mount Lemmon Survey || V || align=right data-sort-value="0.76" | 760 m || 
|-id=264 bgcolor=#fefefe
| 392264 ||  || — || January 4, 2010 || Kitt Peak || Spacewatch || V || align=right data-sort-value="0.65" | 650 m || 
|-id=265 bgcolor=#fefefe
| 392265 ||  || — || January 5, 2010 || Kitt Peak || Spacewatch || — || align=right data-sort-value="0.70" | 700 m || 
|-id=266 bgcolor=#fefefe
| 392266 ||  || — || November 22, 2009 || Kitt Peak || Spacewatch || — || align=right data-sort-value="0.78" | 780 m || 
|-id=267 bgcolor=#fefefe
| 392267 ||  || — || January 6, 2010 || Kitt Peak || Spacewatch || — || align=right | 1.6 km || 
|-id=268 bgcolor=#fefefe
| 392268 ||  || — || January 6, 2010 || Kitt Peak || Spacewatch || — || align=right | 1.6 km || 
|-id=269 bgcolor=#fefefe
| 392269 ||  || — || January 8, 2010 || Kitt Peak || Spacewatch || FLO || align=right data-sort-value="0.74" | 740 m || 
|-id=270 bgcolor=#fefefe
| 392270 ||  || — || January 8, 2010 || Kitt Peak || Spacewatch || — || align=right data-sort-value="0.93" | 930 m || 
|-id=271 bgcolor=#fefefe
| 392271 ||  || — || January 8, 2010 || Kitt Peak || Spacewatch || — || align=right data-sort-value="0.71" | 710 m || 
|-id=272 bgcolor=#fefefe
| 392272 ||  || — || December 10, 2009 || Mount Lemmon || Mount Lemmon Survey || — || align=right data-sort-value="0.82" | 820 m || 
|-id=273 bgcolor=#fefefe
| 392273 ||  || — || January 10, 2010 || Kitt Peak || Spacewatch || ERI || align=right | 1.7 km || 
|-id=274 bgcolor=#fefefe
| 392274 ||  || — || April 5, 2003 || Kitt Peak || Spacewatch || — || align=right data-sort-value="0.66" | 660 m || 
|-id=275 bgcolor=#fefefe
| 392275 ||  || — || January 12, 2010 || Catalina || CSS || — || align=right | 1.6 km || 
|-id=276 bgcolor=#fefefe
| 392276 ||  || — || January 7, 2010 || Kitt Peak || Spacewatch || MAS || align=right data-sort-value="0.66" | 660 m || 
|-id=277 bgcolor=#E9E9E9
| 392277 ||  || — || March 23, 2006 || Catalina || CSS || WIT || align=right | 1.4 km || 
|-id=278 bgcolor=#E9E9E9
| 392278 ||  || — || January 8, 2010 || WISE || WISE || ADE || align=right | 2.2 km || 
|-id=279 bgcolor=#fefefe
| 392279 ||  || — || January 12, 2010 || WISE || WISE || — || align=right | 3.6 km || 
|-id=280 bgcolor=#C2FFFF
| 392280 ||  || — || September 24, 2008 || Mount Lemmon || Mount Lemmon Survey || L4 || align=right | 9.5 km || 
|-id=281 bgcolor=#fefefe
| 392281 ||  || — || April 22, 2007 || Catalina || CSS || V || align=right data-sort-value="0.75" | 750 m || 
|-id=282 bgcolor=#E9E9E9
| 392282 ||  || — || January 18, 2010 || WISE || WISE || KON || align=right | 2.7 km || 
|-id=283 bgcolor=#d6d6d6
| 392283 ||  || — || October 7, 2008 || Mount Lemmon || Mount Lemmon Survey || EUP || align=right | 5.8 km || 
|-id=284 bgcolor=#fefefe
| 392284 ||  || — || December 18, 2009 || Mount Lemmon || Mount Lemmon Survey || — || align=right data-sort-value="0.89" | 890 m || 
|-id=285 bgcolor=#fefefe
| 392285 ||  || — || December 18, 2001 || Socorro || LINEAR || V || align=right data-sort-value="0.96" | 960 m || 
|-id=286 bgcolor=#E9E9E9
| 392286 ||  || — || February 11, 2010 || WISE || WISE || ADE || align=right | 2.7 km || 
|-id=287 bgcolor=#fefefe
| 392287 ||  || — || January 10, 2006 || Mount Lemmon || Mount Lemmon Survey || NYS || align=right data-sort-value="0.76" | 760 m || 
|-id=288 bgcolor=#fefefe
| 392288 ||  || — || January 11, 2010 || Kitt Peak || Spacewatch || — || align=right data-sort-value="0.88" | 880 m || 
|-id=289 bgcolor=#fefefe
| 392289 ||  || — || February 9, 2010 || Kitt Peak || Spacewatch || MAS || align=right data-sort-value="0.81" | 810 m || 
|-id=290 bgcolor=#fefefe
| 392290 ||  || — || February 10, 2010 || Kitt Peak || Spacewatch || — || align=right data-sort-value="0.87" | 870 m || 
|-id=291 bgcolor=#E9E9E9
| 392291 ||  || — || February 13, 2010 || Mount Lemmon || Mount Lemmon Survey || BAR || align=right | 1.4 km || 
|-id=292 bgcolor=#fefefe
| 392292 ||  || — || January 5, 2010 || Kitt Peak || Spacewatch || NYS || align=right data-sort-value="0.61" | 610 m || 
|-id=293 bgcolor=#fefefe
| 392293 ||  || — || October 27, 2005 || Catalina || CSS || V || align=right data-sort-value="0.71" | 710 m || 
|-id=294 bgcolor=#E9E9E9
| 392294 ||  || — || August 21, 2008 || Kitt Peak || Spacewatch || — || align=right | 1.3 km || 
|-id=295 bgcolor=#fefefe
| 392295 ||  || — || May 2, 2003 || Kitt Peak || Spacewatch || NYS || align=right data-sort-value="0.87" | 870 m || 
|-id=296 bgcolor=#fefefe
| 392296 ||  || — || January 5, 2006 || Kitt Peak || Spacewatch || — || align=right data-sort-value="0.75" | 750 m || 
|-id=297 bgcolor=#E9E9E9
| 392297 ||  || — || February 13, 2010 || Kitt Peak || Spacewatch || — || align=right | 2.1 km || 
|-id=298 bgcolor=#d6d6d6
| 392298 ||  || — || March 17, 2005 || Kitt Peak || Spacewatch || THM || align=right | 2.0 km || 
|-id=299 bgcolor=#fefefe
| 392299 ||  || — || February 14, 2010 || Mount Lemmon || Mount Lemmon Survey || NYS || align=right data-sort-value="0.65" | 650 m || 
|-id=300 bgcolor=#E9E9E9
| 392300 ||  || — || February 15, 2010 || WISE || WISE || KON || align=right | 2.1 km || 
|}

392301–392400 

|-bgcolor=#fefefe
| 392301 ||  || — || September 7, 2008 || Mount Lemmon || Mount Lemmon Survey || — || align=right data-sort-value="0.90" | 900 m || 
|-id=302 bgcolor=#fefefe
| 392302 ||  || — || November 25, 2005 || Kitt Peak || Spacewatch || MAS || align=right data-sort-value="0.65" | 650 m || 
|-id=303 bgcolor=#E9E9E9
| 392303 ||  || — || February 13, 2010 || Kitt Peak || Spacewatch || — || align=right | 1.1 km || 
|-id=304 bgcolor=#fefefe
| 392304 ||  || — || February 9, 2010 || Kitt Peak || Spacewatch || MAS || align=right data-sort-value="0.87" | 870 m || 
|-id=305 bgcolor=#fefefe
| 392305 ||  || — || February 10, 2010 || Kitt Peak || Spacewatch || — || align=right data-sort-value="0.70" | 700 m || 
|-id=306 bgcolor=#fefefe
| 392306 ||  || — || February 15, 2010 || Haleakala || Pan-STARRS || — || align=right data-sort-value="0.67" | 670 m || 
|-id=307 bgcolor=#fefefe
| 392307 ||  || — || February 13, 2010 || Socorro || LINEAR || — || align=right data-sort-value="0.96" | 960 m || 
|-id=308 bgcolor=#d6d6d6
| 392308 ||  || — || January 29, 2009 || Mount Lemmon || Mount Lemmon Survey || ALA || align=right | 4.4 km || 
|-id=309 bgcolor=#C2FFFF
| 392309 ||  || — || November 23, 2009 || Mount Lemmon || Mount Lemmon Survey || L4ERY || align=right | 8.4 km || 
|-id=310 bgcolor=#fefefe
| 392310 ||  || — || February 16, 2010 || Kitt Peak || Spacewatch || MAS || align=right data-sort-value="0.75" | 750 m || 
|-id=311 bgcolor=#fefefe
| 392311 ||  || — || February 19, 2010 || Pla D'Arguines || R. Ferrando || — || align=right | 1.3 km || 
|-id=312 bgcolor=#d6d6d6
| 392312 ||  || — || February 21, 2010 || WISE || WISE || — || align=right | 4.0 km || 
|-id=313 bgcolor=#E9E9E9
| 392313 ||  || — || February 26, 2010 || WISE || WISE || — || align=right | 2.5 km || 
|-id=314 bgcolor=#E9E9E9
| 392314 ||  || — || December 30, 2000 || Kitt Peak || Spacewatch || — || align=right | 1.8 km || 
|-id=315 bgcolor=#E9E9E9
| 392315 ||  || — || March 3, 2010 || WISE || WISE || — || align=right | 4.0 km || 
|-id=316 bgcolor=#E9E9E9
| 392316 ||  || — || March 7, 2010 || Guidestar || M. Emmerich, S. Melchert || — || align=right | 1.7 km || 
|-id=317 bgcolor=#E9E9E9
| 392317 ||  || — || February 25, 2006 || Kitt Peak || Spacewatch || — || align=right data-sort-value="0.98" | 980 m || 
|-id=318 bgcolor=#d6d6d6
| 392318 ||  || — || December 20, 2009 || Mount Lemmon || Mount Lemmon Survey || LIX || align=right | 3.5 km || 
|-id=319 bgcolor=#fefefe
| 392319 ||  || — || March 11, 2010 || La Sagra || OAM Obs. || PHO || align=right | 1.1 km || 
|-id=320 bgcolor=#E9E9E9
| 392320 ||  || — || March 4, 2010 || Catalina || CSS || — || align=right | 2.3 km || 
|-id=321 bgcolor=#E9E9E9
| 392321 ||  || — || September 19, 2003 || Campo Imperatore || CINEOS || — || align=right | 2.2 km || 
|-id=322 bgcolor=#fefefe
| 392322 ||  || — || March 12, 2010 || Mount Lemmon || Mount Lemmon Survey || MAS || align=right data-sort-value="0.81" | 810 m || 
|-id=323 bgcolor=#E9E9E9
| 392323 ||  || — || September 26, 2008 || Kitt Peak || Spacewatch || — || align=right data-sort-value="0.92" | 920 m || 
|-id=324 bgcolor=#fefefe
| 392324 ||  || — || March 12, 2010 || Kitt Peak || Spacewatch || NYS || align=right data-sort-value="0.74" | 740 m || 
|-id=325 bgcolor=#fefefe
| 392325 ||  || — || March 12, 2010 || Mount Lemmon || Mount Lemmon Survey || — || align=right | 1.2 km || 
|-id=326 bgcolor=#E9E9E9
| 392326 ||  || — || March 13, 2010 || Kitt Peak || Spacewatch || — || align=right | 1.8 km || 
|-id=327 bgcolor=#E9E9E9
| 392327 ||  || — || January 12, 2010 || Mount Lemmon || Mount Lemmon Survey || — || align=right | 1.8 km || 
|-id=328 bgcolor=#E9E9E9
| 392328 ||  || — || April 18, 2006 || Kitt Peak || Spacewatch || — || align=right | 2.5 km || 
|-id=329 bgcolor=#fefefe
| 392329 ||  || — || March 14, 2010 || Kitt Peak || Spacewatch || — || align=right data-sort-value="0.80" | 800 m || 
|-id=330 bgcolor=#fefefe
| 392330 ||  || — || February 15, 2010 || Kitt Peak || Spacewatch || — || align=right data-sort-value="0.86" | 860 m || 
|-id=331 bgcolor=#fefefe
| 392331 ||  || — || March 14, 2010 || Mount Lemmon || Mount Lemmon Survey || NYS || align=right data-sort-value="0.65" | 650 m || 
|-id=332 bgcolor=#E9E9E9
| 392332 ||  || — || March 15, 2010 || Kitt Peak || Spacewatch || — || align=right | 1.3 km || 
|-id=333 bgcolor=#fefefe
| 392333 ||  || — || March 10, 2010 || Purple Mountain || PMO NEO || — || align=right data-sort-value="0.81" | 810 m || 
|-id=334 bgcolor=#E9E9E9
| 392334 ||  || — || March 12, 2010 || Mount Lemmon || Mount Lemmon Survey || — || align=right data-sort-value="0.78" | 780 m || 
|-id=335 bgcolor=#E9E9E9
| 392335 ||  || — || March 14, 2010 || Kitt Peak || Spacewatch || — || align=right | 1.5 km || 
|-id=336 bgcolor=#fefefe
| 392336 ||  || — || February 9, 2010 || Kitt Peak || Spacewatch || — || align=right | 1.3 km || 
|-id=337 bgcolor=#E9E9E9
| 392337 ||  || — || March 4, 2010 || Kitt Peak || Spacewatch || — || align=right | 1.4 km || 
|-id=338 bgcolor=#E9E9E9
| 392338 ||  || — || March 12, 2010 || Kitt Peak || Spacewatch || KON || align=right | 1.8 km || 
|-id=339 bgcolor=#E9E9E9
| 392339 ||  || — || March 13, 2010 || Kitt Peak || Spacewatch || RAF || align=right data-sort-value="0.88" | 880 m || 
|-id=340 bgcolor=#E9E9E9
| 392340 ||  || — || March 15, 2010 || Kitt Peak || Spacewatch || — || align=right | 1.3 km || 
|-id=341 bgcolor=#E9E9E9
| 392341 ||  || — || March 12, 2010 || Catalina || CSS || RAF || align=right | 1.1 km || 
|-id=342 bgcolor=#d6d6d6
| 392342 ||  || — || March 13, 2010 || Catalina || CSS || — || align=right | 3.9 km || 
|-id=343 bgcolor=#E9E9E9
| 392343 ||  || — || April 19, 2006 || Catalina || CSS || RAF || align=right data-sort-value="0.84" | 840 m || 
|-id=344 bgcolor=#E9E9E9
| 392344 ||  || — || March 12, 2010 || Kitt Peak || Spacewatch || — || align=right | 1.6 km || 
|-id=345 bgcolor=#E9E9E9
| 392345 ||  || — || March 15, 2010 || Catalina || CSS || RAF || align=right | 1.0 km || 
|-id=346 bgcolor=#E9E9E9
| 392346 ||  || — || March 16, 2010 || Mount Lemmon || Mount Lemmon Survey || — || align=right | 2.4 km || 
|-id=347 bgcolor=#fefefe
| 392347 ||  || — || March 18, 2010 || Mount Lemmon || Mount Lemmon Survey || NYS || align=right data-sort-value="0.70" | 700 m || 
|-id=348 bgcolor=#E9E9E9
| 392348 ||  || — || March 18, 2010 || Kitt Peak || Spacewatch || MAR || align=right | 1.3 km || 
|-id=349 bgcolor=#E9E9E9
| 392349 ||  || — || March 20, 2010 || Kitt Peak || Spacewatch || — || align=right | 1.6 km || 
|-id=350 bgcolor=#E9E9E9
| 392350 ||  || — || March 26, 2010 || Kitt Peak || Spacewatch || — || align=right data-sort-value="0.81" | 810 m || 
|-id=351 bgcolor=#E9E9E9
| 392351 ||  || — || March 20, 2010 || Kitt Peak || Spacewatch || — || align=right | 1.5 km || 
|-id=352 bgcolor=#E9E9E9
| 392352 ||  || — || March 21, 2010 || Mount Lemmon || Mount Lemmon Survey || — || align=right | 2.0 km || 
|-id=353 bgcolor=#E9E9E9
| 392353 ||  || — || March 18, 2010 || Mount Lemmon || Mount Lemmon Survey || — || align=right data-sort-value="0.93" | 930 m || 
|-id=354 bgcolor=#E9E9E9
| 392354 ||  || — || March 19, 2010 || Kitt Peak || Spacewatch || — || align=right | 1.8 km || 
|-id=355 bgcolor=#E9E9E9
| 392355 ||  || — || April 8, 2010 || La Sagra || OAM Obs. || — || align=right | 2.3 km || 
|-id=356 bgcolor=#E9E9E9
| 392356 ||  || — || April 8, 2010 || Črni Vrh || Črni Vrh || — || align=right | 1.1 km || 
|-id=357 bgcolor=#FA8072
| 392357 ||  || — || April 9, 2010 || Catalina || CSS || — || align=right | 1.5 km || 
|-id=358 bgcolor=#d6d6d6
| 392358 ||  || — || March 9, 2003 || Kitt Peak || Spacewatch || — || align=right | 4.6 km || 
|-id=359 bgcolor=#E9E9E9
| 392359 ||  || — || March 25, 2010 || Kitt Peak || Spacewatch || NEM || align=right | 2.5 km || 
|-id=360 bgcolor=#E9E9E9
| 392360 ||  || — || March 25, 2010 || Kitt Peak || Spacewatch || — || align=right | 1.7 km || 
|-id=361 bgcolor=#E9E9E9
| 392361 ||  || — || April 4, 2010 || Kitt Peak || Spacewatch || HEN || align=right | 2.7 km || 
|-id=362 bgcolor=#E9E9E9
| 392362 ||  || — || April 6, 2010 || Kitt Peak || Spacewatch || — || align=right | 2.3 km || 
|-id=363 bgcolor=#E9E9E9
| 392363 ||  || — || April 8, 2010 || Kitt Peak || Spacewatch || — || align=right | 2.9 km || 
|-id=364 bgcolor=#E9E9E9
| 392364 ||  || — || April 10, 2010 || Kitt Peak || Spacewatch || — || align=right | 1.4 km || 
|-id=365 bgcolor=#fefefe
| 392365 ||  || — || January 13, 2002 || Kitt Peak || Spacewatch || MAS || align=right data-sort-value="0.64" | 640 m || 
|-id=366 bgcolor=#E9E9E9
| 392366 ||  || — || April 7, 2010 || Mount Lemmon || Mount Lemmon Survey || — || align=right | 1.2 km || 
|-id=367 bgcolor=#E9E9E9
| 392367 ||  || — || March 9, 2005 || Mount Lemmon || Mount Lemmon Survey || AGN || align=right | 1.6 km || 
|-id=368 bgcolor=#E9E9E9
| 392368 ||  || — || April 8, 2010 || XuYi || PMO NEO || — || align=right | 2.7 km || 
|-id=369 bgcolor=#E9E9E9
| 392369 ||  || — || April 11, 2010 || Kitt Peak || Spacewatch || — || align=right | 4.0 km || 
|-id=370 bgcolor=#E9E9E9
| 392370 ||  || — || October 18, 2007 || Kitt Peak || Spacewatch || — || align=right | 1.5 km || 
|-id=371 bgcolor=#E9E9E9
| 392371 ||  || — || April 9, 2010 || Mount Lemmon || Mount Lemmon Survey || EUN || align=right | 1.2 km || 
|-id=372 bgcolor=#E9E9E9
| 392372 ||  || — || June 1, 1997 || Kitt Peak || Spacewatch || — || align=right | 2.3 km || 
|-id=373 bgcolor=#E9E9E9
| 392373 ||  || — || April 19, 2010 || WISE || WISE || POS || align=right | 3.8 km || 
|-id=374 bgcolor=#d6d6d6
| 392374 ||  || — || April 26, 2010 || WISE || WISE || — || align=right | 4.9 km || 
|-id=375 bgcolor=#E9E9E9
| 392375 ||  || — || February 12, 2010 || WISE || WISE || HNS || align=right | 1.3 km || 
|-id=376 bgcolor=#d6d6d6
| 392376 ||  || — || February 26, 2008 || Mount Lemmon || Mount Lemmon Survey || — || align=right | 4.6 km || 
|-id=377 bgcolor=#E9E9E9
| 392377 ||  || — || September 10, 2007 || Kitt Peak || Spacewatch || — || align=right | 1.1 km || 
|-id=378 bgcolor=#E9E9E9
| 392378 ||  || — || April 25, 2010 || Mount Lemmon || Mount Lemmon Survey || — || align=right | 1.3 km || 
|-id=379 bgcolor=#E9E9E9
| 392379 ||  || — || October 22, 2003 || Kitt Peak || Spacewatch || — || align=right | 1.5 km || 
|-id=380 bgcolor=#E9E9E9
| 392380 ||  || — || May 2, 2010 || Kitt Peak || Spacewatch || — || align=right | 1.5 km || 
|-id=381 bgcolor=#E9E9E9
| 392381 ||  || — || May 3, 2010 || Kitt Peak || Spacewatch || — || align=right | 1.5 km || 
|-id=382 bgcolor=#E9E9E9
| 392382 ||  || — || September 29, 2003 || Kitt Peak || Spacewatch || — || align=right | 1.0 km || 
|-id=383 bgcolor=#E9E9E9
| 392383 ||  || — || May 4, 2010 || Nogales || Tenagra II Obs. || — || align=right | 1.6 km || 
|-id=384 bgcolor=#E9E9E9
| 392384 ||  || — || May 3, 2010 || Kitt Peak || Spacewatch || — || align=right | 2.1 km || 
|-id=385 bgcolor=#E9E9E9
| 392385 ||  || — || March 15, 2010 || Mount Lemmon || Mount Lemmon Survey || — || align=right | 1.2 km || 
|-id=386 bgcolor=#E9E9E9
| 392386 ||  || — || May 5, 2010 || Mount Lemmon || Mount Lemmon Survey || JUN || align=right | 1.7 km || 
|-id=387 bgcolor=#E9E9E9
| 392387 ||  || — || October 1, 2003 || Kitt Peak || Spacewatch || — || align=right | 1.9 km || 
|-id=388 bgcolor=#E9E9E9
| 392388 ||  || — || April 16, 2001 || Anderson Mesa || LONEOS || — || align=right | 2.5 km || 
|-id=389 bgcolor=#E9E9E9
| 392389 ||  || — || January 12, 2010 || Mount Lemmon || Mount Lemmon Survey || — || align=right | 2.4 km || 
|-id=390 bgcolor=#E9E9E9
| 392390 ||  || — || February 16, 2010 || Mount Lemmon || Mount Lemmon Survey || — || align=right | 1.3 km || 
|-id=391 bgcolor=#E9E9E9
| 392391 ||  || — || May 14, 2010 || Mount Lemmon || Mount Lemmon Survey || — || align=right | 1.5 km || 
|-id=392 bgcolor=#d6d6d6
| 392392 ||  || — || May 13, 2010 || WISE || WISE || — || align=right | 2.1 km || 
|-id=393 bgcolor=#E9E9E9
| 392393 ||  || — || January 30, 2010 || WISE || WISE || JUN || align=right | 2.8 km || 
|-id=394 bgcolor=#E9E9E9
| 392394 ||  || — || May 9, 2010 || Siding Spring || SSS || — || align=right | 2.2 km || 
|-id=395 bgcolor=#E9E9E9
| 392395 ||  || — || October 24, 2008 || Kitt Peak || Spacewatch || JUN || align=right data-sort-value="0.85" | 850 m || 
|-id=396 bgcolor=#E9E9E9
| 392396 ||  || — || April 9, 2010 || Mount Lemmon || Mount Lemmon Survey || — || align=right | 1.3 km || 
|-id=397 bgcolor=#fefefe
| 392397 ||  || — || May 25, 2003 || Kitt Peak || Spacewatch || V || align=right data-sort-value="0.97" | 970 m || 
|-id=398 bgcolor=#fefefe
| 392398 ||  || — || February 16, 2010 || Catalina || CSS || ERI || align=right | 2.1 km || 
|-id=399 bgcolor=#d6d6d6
| 392399 ||  || — || February 2, 2008 || Mount Lemmon || Mount Lemmon Survey || EMA || align=right | 3.5 km || 
|-id=400 bgcolor=#d6d6d6
| 392400 ||  || — || May 26, 2010 || WISE || WISE || HYG || align=right | 2.9 km || 
|}

392401–392500 

|-bgcolor=#E9E9E9
| 392401 ||  || — || May 19, 2010 || Catalina || CSS || — || align=right | 1.9 km || 
|-id=402 bgcolor=#E9E9E9
| 392402 ||  || — || May 21, 2010 || Mount Lemmon || Mount Lemmon Survey || HNS || align=right | 1.3 km || 
|-id=403 bgcolor=#d6d6d6
| 392403 ||  || — || June 4, 2010 || Kitt Peak || Spacewatch || ALA || align=right | 3.7 km || 
|-id=404 bgcolor=#E9E9E9
| 392404 ||  || — || May 2, 1997 || Caussols || ODAS || — || align=right | 1.8 km || 
|-id=405 bgcolor=#d6d6d6
| 392405 ||  || — || March 12, 2008 || Kitt Peak || Spacewatch || — || align=right | 3.8 km || 
|-id=406 bgcolor=#E9E9E9
| 392406 ||  || — || June 6, 2010 || La Sagra || OAM Obs. || — || align=right | 1.4 km || 
|-id=407 bgcolor=#d6d6d6
| 392407 ||  || — || June 10, 2010 || WISE || WISE || — || align=right | 3.9 km || 
|-id=408 bgcolor=#d6d6d6
| 392408 ||  || — || June 11, 2010 || WISE || WISE || — || align=right | 1.8 km || 
|-id=409 bgcolor=#d6d6d6
| 392409 ||  || — || June 13, 2010 || WISE || WISE || — || align=right | 3.7 km || 
|-id=410 bgcolor=#E9E9E9
| 392410 ||  || — || October 30, 2007 || Kitt Peak || Spacewatch || — || align=right | 1.5 km || 
|-id=411 bgcolor=#d6d6d6
| 392411 ||  || — || March 18, 2009 || Kitt Peak || Spacewatch || — || align=right | 2.8 km || 
|-id=412 bgcolor=#d6d6d6
| 392412 ||  || — || June 15, 2010 || WISE || WISE || EUP || align=right | 4.2 km || 
|-id=413 bgcolor=#d6d6d6
| 392413 ||  || — || August 9, 2004 || Siding Spring || SSS || — || align=right | 4.0 km || 
|-id=414 bgcolor=#d6d6d6
| 392414 ||  || — || June 15, 2010 || WISE || WISE || — || align=right | 3.2 km || 
|-id=415 bgcolor=#E9E9E9
| 392415 ||  || — || October 7, 2008 || Mount Lemmon || Mount Lemmon Survey || ADE || align=right | 2.6 km || 
|-id=416 bgcolor=#E9E9E9
| 392416 ||  || — || March 20, 2010 || Catalina || CSS || GER || align=right | 1.9 km || 
|-id=417 bgcolor=#d6d6d6
| 392417 ||  || — || June 24, 2010 || WISE || WISE || — || align=right | 4.1 km || 
|-id=418 bgcolor=#d6d6d6
| 392418 ||  || — || February 27, 2008 || Mount Lemmon || Mount Lemmon Survey || — || align=right | 3.7 km || 
|-id=419 bgcolor=#d6d6d6
| 392419 ||  || — || June 26, 2010 || WISE || WISE || — || align=right | 6.1 km || 
|-id=420 bgcolor=#d6d6d6
| 392420 ||  || — || June 27, 2010 || WISE || WISE || — || align=right | 3.0 km || 
|-id=421 bgcolor=#d6d6d6
| 392421 ||  || — || June 27, 2010 || WISE || WISE || — || align=right | 5.2 km || 
|-id=422 bgcolor=#d6d6d6
| 392422 ||  || — || September 24, 2005 || Anderson Mesa || LONEOS || — || align=right | 4.0 km || 
|-id=423 bgcolor=#d6d6d6
| 392423 ||  || — || July 5, 2010 || WISE || WISE || EUP || align=right | 5.0 km || 
|-id=424 bgcolor=#d6d6d6
| 392424 ||  || — || July 15, 2010 || WISE || WISE || — || align=right | 3.8 km || 
|-id=425 bgcolor=#d6d6d6
| 392425 ||  || — || April 24, 2003 || Kitt Peak || Spacewatch || — || align=right | 2.9 km || 
|-id=426 bgcolor=#d6d6d6
| 392426 ||  || — || July 14, 2010 || WISE || WISE || — || align=right | 2.5 km || 
|-id=427 bgcolor=#d6d6d6
| 392427 ||  || — || April 19, 2009 || Catalina || CSS || — || align=right | 3.3 km || 
|-id=428 bgcolor=#d6d6d6
| 392428 ||  || — || July 22, 2010 || WISE || WISE || 7:4 || align=right | 2.6 km || 
|-id=429 bgcolor=#d6d6d6
| 392429 ||  || — || July 22, 2010 || WISE || WISE || — || align=right | 4.4 km || 
|-id=430 bgcolor=#E9E9E9
| 392430 ||  || — || July 27, 2010 || WISE || WISE || PAL || align=right | 2.7 km || 
|-id=431 bgcolor=#E9E9E9
| 392431 ||  || — || July 29, 2010 || WISE || WISE || — || align=right | 2.8 km || 
|-id=432 bgcolor=#d6d6d6
| 392432 ||  || — || July 15, 2004 || Siding Spring || SSS || — || align=right | 4.6 km || 
|-id=433 bgcolor=#E9E9E9
| 392433 ||  || — || February 3, 2010 || WISE || WISE || — || align=right | 3.4 km || 
|-id=434 bgcolor=#d6d6d6
| 392434 ||  || — || March 26, 2003 || Campo Imperatore || CINEOS || — || align=right | 3.6 km || 
|-id=435 bgcolor=#d6d6d6
| 392435 ||  || — || October 24, 2005 || Kitt Peak || Spacewatch || — || align=right | 2.5 km || 
|-id=436 bgcolor=#d6d6d6
| 392436 ||  || — || September 6, 2010 || Kitt Peak || Spacewatch || — || align=right | 2.6 km || 
|-id=437 bgcolor=#d6d6d6
| 392437 ||  || — || March 28, 2008 || Kitt Peak || Spacewatch || — || align=right | 3.5 km || 
|-id=438 bgcolor=#d6d6d6
| 392438 ||  || — || September 9, 2010 || Kitt Peak || Spacewatch || — || align=right | 2.3 km || 
|-id=439 bgcolor=#d6d6d6
| 392439 ||  || — || February 11, 2008 || Mount Lemmon || Mount Lemmon Survey || TIR || align=right | 3.0 km || 
|-id=440 bgcolor=#d6d6d6
| 392440 ||  || — || September 8, 2010 || Moletai || K. Černis, J. Zdanavičius || — || align=right | 3.4 km || 
|-id=441 bgcolor=#d6d6d6
| 392441 ||  || — || September 15, 2010 || Mount Lemmon || Mount Lemmon Survey || — || align=right | 3.6 km || 
|-id=442 bgcolor=#d6d6d6
| 392442 ||  || — || September 4, 2010 || Mount Lemmon || Mount Lemmon Survey || EOS || align=right | 2.4 km || 
|-id=443 bgcolor=#FA8072
| 392443 ||  || — || April 17, 2009 || Mount Lemmon || Mount Lemmon Survey || H || align=right data-sort-value="0.74" | 740 m || 
|-id=444 bgcolor=#d6d6d6
| 392444 ||  || — || February 16, 2007 || Catalina || CSS || EUP || align=right | 4.9 km || 
|-id=445 bgcolor=#d6d6d6
| 392445 ||  || — || May 5, 2008 || Mount Lemmon || Mount Lemmon Survey || — || align=right | 3.3 km || 
|-id=446 bgcolor=#C2FFFF
| 392446 ||  || — || September 7, 2008 || Mount Lemmon || Mount Lemmon Survey || L4 || align=right | 9.5 km || 
|-id=447 bgcolor=#d6d6d6
| 392447 ||  || — || November 12, 1999 || Socorro || LINEAR || THM || align=right | 2.4 km || 
|-id=448 bgcolor=#fefefe
| 392448 ||  || — || September 15, 2007 || Mount Lemmon || Mount Lemmon Survey || — || align=right data-sort-value="0.71" | 710 m || 
|-id=449 bgcolor=#C2FFFF
| 392449 ||  || — || October 28, 2010 || Mount Lemmon || Mount Lemmon Survey || L4 || align=right | 9.5 km || 
|-id=450 bgcolor=#d6d6d6
| 392450 ||  || — || February 2, 2008 || Kitt Peak || Spacewatch || — || align=right | 3.5 km || 
|-id=451 bgcolor=#C2FFFF
| 392451 ||  || — || September 19, 2009 || Kitt Peak || Spacewatch || L4 || align=right | 9.0 km || 
|-id=452 bgcolor=#C2FFFF
| 392452 ||  || — || November 6, 2010 || Kitt Peak || Spacewatch || L4 || align=right | 11 km || 
|-id=453 bgcolor=#C2FFFF
| 392453 ||  || — || November 5, 2010 || Mount Lemmon || Mount Lemmon Survey || L4 || align=right | 8.3 km || 
|-id=454 bgcolor=#C2FFFF
| 392454 ||  || — || September 15, 2009 || Kitt Peak || Spacewatch || L4 || align=right | 7.7 km || 
|-id=455 bgcolor=#C2FFFF
| 392455 ||  || — || August 27, 2009 || Kitt Peak || Spacewatch || L4 || align=right | 8.3 km || 
|-id=456 bgcolor=#C2FFFF
| 392456 ||  || — || September 17, 2009 || Kitt Peak || Spacewatch || L4ARK || align=right | 8.3 km || 
|-id=457 bgcolor=#C2FFFF
| 392457 ||  || — || October 27, 2009 || Mount Lemmon || Mount Lemmon Survey || L4 || align=right | 8.4 km || 
|-id=458 bgcolor=#C2FFFF
| 392458 ||  || — || November 14, 2010 || Mount Lemmon || Mount Lemmon Survey || L4 || align=right | 7.8 km || 
|-id=459 bgcolor=#C2FFFF
| 392459 ||  || — || September 21, 2009 || Kitt Peak || Spacewatch || L4 || align=right | 7.7 km || 
|-id=460 bgcolor=#C2FFFF
| 392460 ||  || — || November 8, 2010 || Mount Lemmon || Mount Lemmon Survey || L4ERY || align=right | 7.0 km || 
|-id=461 bgcolor=#C2FFFF
| 392461 ||  || — || September 25, 2009 || Kitt Peak || Spacewatch || L4ERY || align=right | 8.6 km || 
|-id=462 bgcolor=#C2FFFF
| 392462 ||  || — || November 6, 2010 || Mount Lemmon || Mount Lemmon Survey || L4ERY || align=right | 7.8 km || 
|-id=463 bgcolor=#d6d6d6
| 392463 ||  || — || October 23, 2009 || Mount Lemmon || Mount Lemmon Survey || — || align=right | 1.8 km || 
|-id=464 bgcolor=#E9E9E9
| 392464 ||  || — || March 13, 2007 || Mount Lemmon || Mount Lemmon Survey || — || align=right | 1.9 km || 
|-id=465 bgcolor=#fefefe
| 392465 ||  || — || June 17, 2009 || Mount Lemmon || Mount Lemmon Survey || H || align=right data-sort-value="0.56" | 560 m || 
|-id=466 bgcolor=#FA8072
| 392466 ||  || — || September 30, 2006 || Mount Lemmon || Mount Lemmon Survey || critical || align=right | 1.1 km || 
|-id=467 bgcolor=#fefefe
| 392467 ||  || — || January 24, 2011 || Mount Lemmon || Mount Lemmon Survey || MAS || align=right data-sort-value="0.83" | 830 m || 
|-id=468 bgcolor=#fefefe
| 392468 ||  || — || February 5, 2011 || Catalina || CSS || — || align=right | 1.2 km || 
|-id=469 bgcolor=#fefefe
| 392469 ||  || — || March 10, 2007 || Kitt Peak || Spacewatch || MAS || align=right data-sort-value="0.86" | 860 m || 
|-id=470 bgcolor=#E9E9E9
| 392470 ||  || — || February 27, 2007 || Kitt Peak || Spacewatch || — || align=right | 1.4 km || 
|-id=471 bgcolor=#E9E9E9
| 392471 ||  || — || April 14, 2007 || Kitt Peak || Spacewatch || WIT || align=right | 1.1 km || 
|-id=472 bgcolor=#fefefe
| 392472 ||  || — || March 28, 2011 || Kitt Peak || Spacewatch || — || align=right data-sort-value="0.69" | 690 m || 
|-id=473 bgcolor=#fefefe
| 392473 ||  || — || March 4, 2011 || Mount Lemmon || Mount Lemmon Survey || — || align=right data-sort-value="0.64" | 640 m || 
|-id=474 bgcolor=#fefefe
| 392474 ||  || — || March 18, 2004 || Kitt Peak || Spacewatch || FLO || align=right data-sort-value="0.63" | 630 m || 
|-id=475 bgcolor=#fefefe
| 392475 ||  || — || April 24, 2008 || Kitt Peak || Spacewatch || — || align=right data-sort-value="0.76" | 760 m || 
|-id=476 bgcolor=#FFC2E0
| 392476 ||  || — || April 14, 2008 || Mount Lemmon || Mount Lemmon Survey || APOcritical || align=right data-sort-value="0.54" | 540 m || 
|-id=477 bgcolor=#E9E9E9
| 392477 ||  || — || March 11, 2011 || Kitt Peak || Spacewatch || WAT || align=right | 2.0 km || 
|-id=478 bgcolor=#E9E9E9
| 392478 ||  || — || November 12, 1999 || Socorro || LINEAR || — || align=right | 2.5 km || 
|-id=479 bgcolor=#fefefe
| 392479 ||  || — || April 22, 2011 || Kitt Peak || Spacewatch || V || align=right data-sort-value="0.63" | 630 m || 
|-id=480 bgcolor=#fefefe
| 392480 ||  || — || October 21, 1995 || Kitt Peak || Spacewatch || — || align=right data-sort-value="0.83" | 830 m || 
|-id=481 bgcolor=#fefefe
| 392481 ||  || — || October 27, 2009 || Mount Lemmon || Mount Lemmon Survey || — || align=right data-sort-value="0.75" | 750 m || 
|-id=482 bgcolor=#fefefe
| 392482 ||  || — || March 29, 2011 || Kitt Peak || Spacewatch || — || align=right data-sort-value="0.60" | 600 m || 
|-id=483 bgcolor=#d6d6d6
| 392483 ||  || — || October 16, 2003 || Kitt Peak || Spacewatch || — || align=right | 3.2 km || 
|-id=484 bgcolor=#E9E9E9
| 392484 ||  || — || November 3, 2008 || Catalina || CSS || — || align=right | 2.2 km || 
|-id=485 bgcolor=#fefefe
| 392485 ||  || — || July 30, 2008 || Mount Lemmon || Mount Lemmon Survey || — || align=right data-sort-value="0.79" | 790 m || 
|-id=486 bgcolor=#fefefe
| 392486 ||  || — || March 14, 2004 || Kitt Peak || Spacewatch || — || align=right data-sort-value="0.87" | 870 m || 
|-id=487 bgcolor=#fefefe
| 392487 ||  || — || February 16, 2004 || Kitt Peak || Spacewatch || — || align=right data-sort-value="0.99" | 990 m || 
|-id=488 bgcolor=#fefefe
| 392488 ||  || — || November 5, 1999 || Kitt Peak || Spacewatch || — || align=right data-sort-value="0.72" | 720 m || 
|-id=489 bgcolor=#fefefe
| 392489 ||  || — || February 25, 2007 || Kitt Peak || Spacewatch || — || align=right data-sort-value="0.78" | 780 m || 
|-id=490 bgcolor=#fefefe
| 392490 ||  || — || January 9, 2007 || Mount Lemmon || Mount Lemmon Survey || — || align=right data-sort-value="0.82" | 820 m || 
|-id=491 bgcolor=#fefefe
| 392491 ||  || — || August 28, 2005 || Kitt Peak || Spacewatch || — || align=right data-sort-value="0.70" | 700 m || 
|-id=492 bgcolor=#fefefe
| 392492 ||  || — || March 26, 2007 || Mount Lemmon || Mount Lemmon Survey || FLO || align=right data-sort-value="0.68" | 680 m || 
|-id=493 bgcolor=#FA8072
| 392493 ||  || — || June 10, 2004 || Campo Imperatore || CINEOS || — || align=right data-sort-value="0.91" | 910 m || 
|-id=494 bgcolor=#fefefe
| 392494 ||  || — || June 27, 2011 || Mount Lemmon || Mount Lemmon Survey || MAS || align=right data-sort-value="0.94" | 940 m || 
|-id=495 bgcolor=#fefefe
| 392495 ||  || — || October 11, 2004 || Kitt Peak || Spacewatch || NYS || align=right data-sort-value="0.63" | 630 m || 
|-id=496 bgcolor=#fefefe
| 392496 ||  || — || December 30, 2005 || Kitt Peak || Spacewatch || V || align=right data-sort-value="0.76" | 760 m || 
|-id=497 bgcolor=#fefefe
| 392497 ||  || — || September 21, 2008 || Kitt Peak || Spacewatch || V || align=right data-sort-value="0.85" | 850 m || 
|-id=498 bgcolor=#fefefe
| 392498 ||  || — || April 16, 2004 || Socorro || LINEAR || — || align=right data-sort-value="0.81" | 810 m || 
|-id=499 bgcolor=#fefefe
| 392499 ||  || — || December 28, 2005 || Mount Lemmon || Mount Lemmon Survey || NYS || align=right data-sort-value="0.62" | 620 m || 
|-id=500 bgcolor=#fefefe
| 392500 ||  || — || September 29, 2008 || Mount Lemmon || Mount Lemmon Survey || — || align=right | 1.1 km || 
|}

392501–392600 

|-bgcolor=#d6d6d6
| 392501 ||  || — || October 11, 2006 || Kitt Peak || Spacewatch || — || align=right | 2.7 km || 
|-id=502 bgcolor=#d6d6d6
| 392502 ||  || — || February 20, 2009 || Kitt Peak || Spacewatch || — || align=right | 2.8 km || 
|-id=503 bgcolor=#fefefe
| 392503 ||  || — || October 9, 2004 || Kitt Peak || Spacewatch || MAS || align=right data-sort-value="0.73" | 730 m || 
|-id=504 bgcolor=#fefefe
| 392504 ||  || — || February 4, 2006 || Kitt Peak || Spacewatch || NYS || align=right data-sort-value="0.80" | 800 m || 
|-id=505 bgcolor=#fefefe
| 392505 ||  || — || October 6, 2008 || Mount Lemmon || Mount Lemmon Survey || — || align=right | 1.1 km || 
|-id=506 bgcolor=#d6d6d6
| 392506 ||  || — || September 11, 2006 || Catalina || CSS || — || align=right | 3.8 km || 
|-id=507 bgcolor=#fefefe
| 392507 ||  || — || September 10, 2004 || Socorro || LINEAR || — || align=right data-sort-value="0.79" | 790 m || 
|-id=508 bgcolor=#fefefe
| 392508 ||  || — || March 13, 2010 || Mount Lemmon || Mount Lemmon Survey || — || align=right | 1.1 km || 
|-id=509 bgcolor=#E9E9E9
| 392509 ||  || — || January 14, 2010 || WISE || WISE || — || align=right | 3.2 km || 
|-id=510 bgcolor=#fefefe
| 392510 ||  || — || July 3, 2011 || Catalina || CSS || V || align=right data-sort-value="0.88" | 880 m || 
|-id=511 bgcolor=#fefefe
| 392511 ||  || — || April 20, 2007 || Kitt Peak || Spacewatch || NYS || align=right data-sort-value="0.69" | 690 m || 
|-id=512 bgcolor=#d6d6d6
| 392512 ||  || — || August 21, 2006 || Kitt Peak || Spacewatch || CHA || align=right | 2.1 km || 
|-id=513 bgcolor=#E9E9E9
| 392513 ||  || — || October 1, 2003 || Kitt Peak || Spacewatch || RAF || align=right data-sort-value="0.84" | 840 m || 
|-id=514 bgcolor=#E9E9E9
| 392514 ||  || — || November 5, 2007 || Kitt Peak || Spacewatch || HOF || align=right | 2.6 km || 
|-id=515 bgcolor=#fefefe
| 392515 ||  || — || May 1, 2003 || Kitt Peak || Spacewatch || NYS || align=right data-sort-value="0.71" | 710 m || 
|-id=516 bgcolor=#fefefe
| 392516 ||  || — || October 1, 2000 || Socorro || LINEAR || NYS || align=right data-sort-value="0.81" | 810 m || 
|-id=517 bgcolor=#E9E9E9
| 392517 ||  || — || May 26, 2006 || Kitt Peak || Spacewatch || HNS || align=right | 1.4 km || 
|-id=518 bgcolor=#E9E9E9
| 392518 ||  || — || October 19, 2007 || Kitt Peak || Spacewatch || — || align=right | 2.3 km || 
|-id=519 bgcolor=#E9E9E9
| 392519 ||  || — || September 13, 2007 || Catalina || CSS || GER || align=right | 2.0 km || 
|-id=520 bgcolor=#fefefe
| 392520 ||  || — || July 25, 2004 || Anderson Mesa || LONEOS || — || align=right data-sort-value="0.82" | 820 m || 
|-id=521 bgcolor=#fefefe
| 392521 ||  || — || February 25, 2006 || Mount Lemmon || Mount Lemmon Survey || NYS || align=right data-sort-value="0.86" | 860 m || 
|-id=522 bgcolor=#d6d6d6
| 392522 ||  || — || March 15, 2004 || Kitt Peak || Spacewatch || — || align=right | 2.8 km || 
|-id=523 bgcolor=#fefefe
| 392523 ||  || — || January 25, 2006 || Kitt Peak || Spacewatch || CLA || align=right | 2.3 km || 
|-id=524 bgcolor=#d6d6d6
| 392524 ||  || — || March 11, 2010 || WISE || WISE || — || align=right | 5.1 km || 
|-id=525 bgcolor=#E9E9E9
| 392525 ||  || — || October 10, 2007 || Mount Lemmon || Mount Lemmon Survey || — || align=right | 1.2 km || 
|-id=526 bgcolor=#fefefe
| 392526 ||  || — || October 16, 1993 || Kitt Peak || Spacewatch || NYS || align=right data-sort-value="0.60" | 600 m || 
|-id=527 bgcolor=#d6d6d6
| 392527 ||  || — || August 1, 2005 || Campo Imperatore || CINEOS || — || align=right | 3.2 km || 
|-id=528 bgcolor=#d6d6d6
| 392528 ||  || — || December 30, 2007 || Kitt Peak || Spacewatch || EOS || align=right | 2.1 km || 
|-id=529 bgcolor=#E9E9E9
| 392529 ||  || — || May 7, 2005 || Kitt Peak || Spacewatch || — || align=right | 3.0 km || 
|-id=530 bgcolor=#d6d6d6
| 392530 ||  || — || August 20, 2006 || Kitt Peak || Spacewatch || EOS || align=right | 2.0 km || 
|-id=531 bgcolor=#E9E9E9
| 392531 ||  || — || January 12, 2010 || WISE || WISE || JUN || align=right | 2.7 km || 
|-id=532 bgcolor=#fefefe
| 392532 ||  || — || January 27, 2006 || Kitt Peak || Spacewatch || V || align=right data-sort-value="0.76" | 760 m || 
|-id=533 bgcolor=#fefefe
| 392533 ||  || — || May 29, 2003 || Socorro || LINEAR || — || align=right | 1.2 km || 
|-id=534 bgcolor=#E9E9E9
| 392534 ||  || — || November 2, 2007 || Kitt Peak || Spacewatch || PAD || align=right | 3.1 km || 
|-id=535 bgcolor=#d6d6d6
| 392535 ||  || — || July 18, 2006 || Mount Lemmon || Mount Lemmon Survey || — || align=right | 2.4 km || 
|-id=536 bgcolor=#E9E9E9
| 392536 ||  || — || November 12, 2007 || Mount Lemmon || Mount Lemmon Survey || WIT || align=right data-sort-value="0.89" | 890 m || 
|-id=537 bgcolor=#d6d6d6
| 392537 ||  || — || June 9, 2010 || Kitt Peak || Spacewatch || EUP || align=right | 3.7 km || 
|-id=538 bgcolor=#d6d6d6
| 392538 ||  || — || November 19, 2000 || Socorro || LINEAR || EUP || align=right | 4.3 km || 
|-id=539 bgcolor=#d6d6d6
| 392539 ||  || — || December 30, 2008 || Mount Lemmon || Mount Lemmon Survey || — || align=right | 3.2 km || 
|-id=540 bgcolor=#E9E9E9
| 392540 ||  || — || September 14, 2007 || Mount Lemmon || Mount Lemmon Survey || — || align=right | 1.6 km || 
|-id=541 bgcolor=#E9E9E9
| 392541 ||  || — || February 19, 2009 || Mount Lemmon || Mount Lemmon Survey || — || align=right | 2.3 km || 
|-id=542 bgcolor=#d6d6d6
| 392542 ||  || — || October 16, 2006 || Catalina || CSS || — || align=right | 3.2 km || 
|-id=543 bgcolor=#d6d6d6
| 392543 ||  || — || October 10, 1994 || Kitt Peak || Spacewatch || — || align=right | 3.0 km || 
|-id=544 bgcolor=#fefefe
| 392544 ||  || — || August 21, 2000 || Anderson Mesa || LONEOS || ERIcritical || align=right | 1.3 km || 
|-id=545 bgcolor=#E9E9E9
| 392545 ||  || — || October 14, 2007 || Kitt Peak || Spacewatch || — || align=right | 1.4 km || 
|-id=546 bgcolor=#E9E9E9
| 392546 ||  || — || November 18, 2007 || Kitt Peak || Spacewatch || — || align=right | 2.4 km || 
|-id=547 bgcolor=#d6d6d6
| 392547 ||  || — || November 8, 2007 || Mount Lemmon || Mount Lemmon Survey || — || align=right | 3.1 km || 
|-id=548 bgcolor=#E9E9E9
| 392548 ||  || — || November 3, 2007 || Mount Lemmon || Mount Lemmon Survey || — || align=right | 1.9 km || 
|-id=549 bgcolor=#fefefe
| 392549 ||  || — || October 9, 2004 || Kitt Peak || Spacewatch || NYS || align=right data-sort-value="0.78" | 780 m || 
|-id=550 bgcolor=#fefefe
| 392550 ||  || — || April 20, 2007 || Mount Lemmon || Mount Lemmon Survey || NYS || align=right data-sort-value="0.60" | 600 m || 
|-id=551 bgcolor=#d6d6d6
| 392551 ||  || — || January 18, 2002 || Cima Ekar || ADAS || — || align=right | 2.6 km || 
|-id=552 bgcolor=#d6d6d6
| 392552 ||  || — || October 3, 2006 || Mount Lemmon || Mount Lemmon Survey || EOS || align=right | 1.8 km || 
|-id=553 bgcolor=#d6d6d6
| 392553 ||  || — || September 25, 2006 || Kitt Peak || Spacewatch || — || align=right | 3.0 km || 
|-id=554 bgcolor=#fefefe
| 392554 ||  || — || September 21, 2011 || Catalina || CSS || — || align=right | 1.3 km || 
|-id=555 bgcolor=#fefefe
| 392555 ||  || — || September 8, 2011 || Kitt Peak || Spacewatch || MAS || align=right data-sort-value="0.74" | 740 m || 
|-id=556 bgcolor=#d6d6d6
| 392556 ||  || — || October 5, 2000 || Kitt Peak || Spacewatch || VER || align=right | 2.8 km || 
|-id=557 bgcolor=#fefefe
| 392557 ||  || — || October 4, 2004 || Kitt Peak || Spacewatch || — || align=right data-sort-value="0.91" | 910 m || 
|-id=558 bgcolor=#fefefe
| 392558 ||  || — || May 12, 2007 || Mount Lemmon || Mount Lemmon Survey || NYS || align=right data-sort-value="0.79" | 790 m || 
|-id=559 bgcolor=#E9E9E9
| 392559 ||  || — || October 6, 2007 || Kitt Peak || Spacewatch || — || align=right | 2.0 km || 
|-id=560 bgcolor=#d6d6d6
| 392560 ||  || — || November 19, 2007 || Mount Lemmon || Mount Lemmon Survey || 615 || align=right | 1.9 km || 
|-id=561 bgcolor=#E9E9E9
| 392561 ||  || — || November 2, 2007 || Mount Lemmon || Mount Lemmon Survey || — || align=right | 1.5 km || 
|-id=562 bgcolor=#d6d6d6
| 392562 ||  || — || October 19, 2006 || Catalina || CSS || — || align=right | 3.3 km || 
|-id=563 bgcolor=#fefefe
| 392563 ||  || — || May 29, 2003 || Socorro || LINEAR || — || align=right | 2.5 km || 
|-id=564 bgcolor=#E9E9E9
| 392564 ||  || — || August 19, 2006 || Kitt Peak || Spacewatch || — || align=right | 2.3 km || 
|-id=565 bgcolor=#E9E9E9
| 392565 ||  || — || November 1, 2007 || Kitt Peak || Spacewatch || — || align=right | 1.4 km || 
|-id=566 bgcolor=#E9E9E9
| 392566 ||  || — || December 3, 2007 || Kitt Peak || Spacewatch || — || align=right | 2.6 km || 
|-id=567 bgcolor=#fefefe
| 392567 ||  || — || July 15, 2007 || Siding Spring || SSS || — || align=right data-sort-value="0.91" | 910 m || 
|-id=568 bgcolor=#d6d6d6
| 392568 ||  || — || August 28, 2011 || Siding Spring || SSS || — || align=right | 3.7 km || 
|-id=569 bgcolor=#E9E9E9
| 392569 ||  || — || October 7, 2007 || Mount Lemmon || Mount Lemmon Survey || — || align=right | 1.7 km || 
|-id=570 bgcolor=#d6d6d6
| 392570 ||  || — || September 23, 2011 || Kitt Peak || Spacewatch || EOS || align=right | 2.0 km || 
|-id=571 bgcolor=#d6d6d6
| 392571 ||  || — || October 21, 2006 || Mount Lemmon || Mount Lemmon Survey || VER || align=right | 2.9 km || 
|-id=572 bgcolor=#fefefe
| 392572 ||  || — || October 15, 2004 || Mount Lemmon || Mount Lemmon Survey || MAS || align=right data-sort-value="0.98" | 980 m || 
|-id=573 bgcolor=#d6d6d6
| 392573 ||  || — || July 22, 2006 || Mount Lemmon || Mount Lemmon Survey || 629 || align=right | 1.4 km || 
|-id=574 bgcolor=#d6d6d6
| 392574 ||  || — || March 19, 2009 || Kitt Peak || Spacewatch || — || align=right | 2.8 km || 
|-id=575 bgcolor=#d6d6d6
| 392575 ||  || — || September 23, 2011 || Kitt Peak || Spacewatch || EOS || align=right | 1.7 km || 
|-id=576 bgcolor=#E9E9E9
| 392576 ||  || — || September 19, 1998 || Kitt Peak || Spacewatch || — || align=right | 1.4 km || 
|-id=577 bgcolor=#E9E9E9
| 392577 ||  || — || March 17, 2005 || Mount Lemmon || Mount Lemmon Survey || — || align=right | 1.4 km || 
|-id=578 bgcolor=#d6d6d6
| 392578 ||  || — || October 16, 2006 || Kitt Peak || Spacewatch || — || align=right | 3.2 km || 
|-id=579 bgcolor=#E9E9E9
| 392579 ||  || — || September 15, 2006 || Kitt Peak || Spacewatch || AGN || align=right | 1.3 km || 
|-id=580 bgcolor=#d6d6d6
| 392580 ||  || — || April 22, 2009 || Mount Lemmon || Mount Lemmon Survey || VER || align=right | 2.8 km || 
|-id=581 bgcolor=#d6d6d6
| 392581 ||  || — || September 21, 2011 || Kitt Peak || Spacewatch || — || align=right | 3.4 km || 
|-id=582 bgcolor=#fefefe
| 392582 ||  || — || February 1, 2006 || Kitt Peak || Spacewatch || MAS || align=right data-sort-value="0.84" | 840 m || 
|-id=583 bgcolor=#E9E9E9
| 392583 ||  || — || September 28, 1997 || Kitt Peak || Spacewatch || — || align=right | 2.7 km || 
|-id=584 bgcolor=#d6d6d6
| 392584 ||  || — || October 17, 2006 || Kitt Peak || Spacewatch || — || align=right | 2.9 km || 
|-id=585 bgcolor=#d6d6d6
| 392585 ||  || — || October 1, 2000 || Anderson Mesa || LONEOS || — || align=right | 4.1 km || 
|-id=586 bgcolor=#E9E9E9
| 392586 ||  || — || April 10, 2010 || WISE || WISE || PAL || align=right | 2.4 km || 
|-id=587 bgcolor=#fefefe
| 392587 ||  || — || January 30, 2006 || Kitt Peak || Spacewatch || MAS || align=right data-sort-value="0.78" | 780 m || 
|-id=588 bgcolor=#E9E9E9
| 392588 ||  || — || November 18, 2007 || Mount Lemmon || Mount Lemmon Survey || WIT || align=right | 1.1 km || 
|-id=589 bgcolor=#d6d6d6
| 392589 ||  || — || March 2, 2009 || Kitt Peak || Spacewatch || NAE || align=right | 1.9 km || 
|-id=590 bgcolor=#E9E9E9
| 392590 ||  || — || October 5, 2007 || Kitt Peak || Spacewatch || — || align=right | 1.6 km || 
|-id=591 bgcolor=#E9E9E9
| 392591 ||  || — || July 29, 2010 || WISE || WISE || GEF || align=right | 2.8 km || 
|-id=592 bgcolor=#fefefe
| 392592 ||  || — || September 13, 2007 || Mount Lemmon || Mount Lemmon Survey || NYS || align=right data-sort-value="0.72" | 720 m || 
|-id=593 bgcolor=#fefefe
| 392593 ||  || — || June 26, 2007 || Kitt Peak || Spacewatch || CLA || align=right | 2.0 km || 
|-id=594 bgcolor=#d6d6d6
| 392594 ||  || — || September 23, 2005 || Kitt Peak || Spacewatch || ELF || align=right | 3.6 km || 
|-id=595 bgcolor=#E9E9E9
| 392595 ||  || — || September 21, 2011 || Kitt Peak || Spacewatch || — || align=right | 2.3 km || 
|-id=596 bgcolor=#d6d6d6
| 392596 ||  || — || September 19, 2006 || Catalina || CSS || — || align=right | 3.0 km || 
|-id=597 bgcolor=#d6d6d6
| 392597 ||  || — || August 18, 2006 || Kitt Peak || Spacewatch || — || align=right | 3.0 km || 
|-id=598 bgcolor=#E9E9E9
| 392598 ||  || — || April 16, 2005 || Kitt Peak || Spacewatch || — || align=right | 2.3 km || 
|-id=599 bgcolor=#d6d6d6
| 392599 ||  || — || May 19, 2004 || Campo Imperatore || CINEOS || — || align=right | 3.1 km || 
|-id=600 bgcolor=#E9E9E9
| 392600 ||  || — || July 22, 2010 || WISE || WISE || — || align=right | 2.6 km || 
|}

392601–392700 

|-bgcolor=#d6d6d6
| 392601 ||  || — || September 29, 2011 || Mount Lemmon || Mount Lemmon Survey || — || align=right | 3.2 km || 
|-id=602 bgcolor=#d6d6d6
| 392602 ||  || — || October 2, 2006 || Mount Lemmon || Mount Lemmon Survey || — || align=right | 2.6 km || 
|-id=603 bgcolor=#E9E9E9
| 392603 ||  || — || May 7, 2006 || Kitt Peak || Spacewatch || — || align=right data-sort-value="0.98" | 980 m || 
|-id=604 bgcolor=#d6d6d6
| 392604 ||  || — || December 16, 2007 || Kitt Peak || Spacewatch || KOR || align=right | 1.5 km || 
|-id=605 bgcolor=#d6d6d6
| 392605 ||  || — || April 22, 2009 || Mount Lemmon || Mount Lemmon Survey || — || align=right | 3.0 km || 
|-id=606 bgcolor=#E9E9E9
| 392606 ||  || — || March 14, 2005 || Mount Lemmon || Mount Lemmon Survey || — || align=right | 2.4 km || 
|-id=607 bgcolor=#d6d6d6
| 392607 ||  || — || March 29, 2009 || Kitt Peak || Spacewatch || — || align=right | 3.2 km || 
|-id=608 bgcolor=#d6d6d6
| 392608 ||  || — || October 27, 2006 || Kitt Peak || Spacewatch || — || align=right | 2.8 km || 
|-id=609 bgcolor=#d6d6d6
| 392609 ||  || — || October 21, 2006 || Mount Lemmon || Mount Lemmon Survey || — || align=right | 2.5 km || 
|-id=610 bgcolor=#d6d6d6
| 392610 ||  || — || March 14, 2004 || Kitt Peak || Spacewatch || KOR || align=right | 1.2 km || 
|-id=611 bgcolor=#d6d6d6
| 392611 ||  || — || September 22, 2011 || Kitt Peak || Spacewatch || EOS || align=right | 2.0 km || 
|-id=612 bgcolor=#E9E9E9
| 392612 ||  || — || August 27, 2006 || Kitt Peak || Spacewatch || POS || align=right | 2.8 km || 
|-id=613 bgcolor=#E9E9E9
| 392613 ||  || — || February 17, 2004 || Socorro || LINEAR || — || align=right | 3.0 km || 
|-id=614 bgcolor=#E9E9E9
| 392614 ||  || — || February 1, 2010 || WISE || WISE || — || align=right | 2.8 km || 
|-id=615 bgcolor=#d6d6d6
| 392615 ||  || — || September 26, 2006 || Kitt Peak || Spacewatch || — || align=right | 2.4 km || 
|-id=616 bgcolor=#E9E9E9
| 392616 ||  || — || May 24, 2006 || Catalina || CSS || BRU || align=right | 2.2 km || 
|-id=617 bgcolor=#d6d6d6
| 392617 ||  || — || February 10, 2008 || Mount Lemmon || Mount Lemmon Survey || — || align=right | 3.1 km || 
|-id=618 bgcolor=#d6d6d6
| 392618 ||  || — || May 25, 2003 || Kitt Peak || Spacewatch || — || align=right | 4.0 km || 
|-id=619 bgcolor=#E9E9E9
| 392619 ||  || — || November 4, 2007 || Kitt Peak || Spacewatch || — || align=right | 3.1 km || 
|-id=620 bgcolor=#d6d6d6
| 392620 ||  || — || February 9, 2008 || Mount Lemmon || Mount Lemmon Survey || — || align=right | 3.2 km || 
|-id=621 bgcolor=#d6d6d6
| 392621 ||  || — || October 1, 2005 || Mount Lemmon || Mount Lemmon Survey || — || align=right | 3.4 km || 
|-id=622 bgcolor=#d6d6d6
| 392622 ||  || — || October 12, 2005 || Kitt Peak || Spacewatch || — || align=right | 4.3 km || 
|-id=623 bgcolor=#E9E9E9
| 392623 ||  || — || October 9, 2002 || Socorro || LINEAR || EUN || align=right | 1.5 km || 
|-id=624 bgcolor=#d6d6d6
| 392624 ||  || — || September 23, 2011 || Mount Lemmon || Mount Lemmon Survey || — || align=right | 3.7 km || 
|-id=625 bgcolor=#d6d6d6
| 392625 ||  || — || April 9, 2010 || WISE || WISE || — || align=right | 4.1 km || 
|-id=626 bgcolor=#d6d6d6
| 392626 ||  || — || October 1, 2005 || Catalina || CSS || — || align=right | 4.3 km || 
|-id=627 bgcolor=#d6d6d6
| 392627 ||  || — || November 22, 2006 || Kitt Peak || Spacewatch || — || align=right | 3.2 km || 
|-id=628 bgcolor=#d6d6d6
| 392628 ||  || — || September 30, 2011 || Kitt Peak || Spacewatch || VER || align=right | 2.6 km || 
|-id=629 bgcolor=#d6d6d6
| 392629 ||  || — || November 16, 2006 || Catalina || CSS || — || align=right | 2.9 km || 
|-id=630 bgcolor=#d6d6d6
| 392630 ||  || — || October 19, 1995 || Kitt Peak || Spacewatch || — || align=right | 3.3 km || 
|-id=631 bgcolor=#E9E9E9
| 392631 ||  || — || March 13, 2005 || Mount Lemmon || Mount Lemmon Survey || — || align=right | 2.7 km || 
|-id=632 bgcolor=#d6d6d6
| 392632 ||  || — || October 11, 2005 || Kitt Peak || Spacewatch || EOS || align=right | 1.9 km || 
|-id=633 bgcolor=#d6d6d6
| 392633 ||  || — || September 17, 2010 || Mount Lemmon || Mount Lemmon Survey || VER || align=right | 3.1 km || 
|-id=634 bgcolor=#d6d6d6
| 392634 ||  || — || October 1, 2006 || Kitt Peak || Spacewatch || — || align=right | 2.6 km || 
|-id=635 bgcolor=#d6d6d6
| 392635 ||  || — || October 25, 1995 || Kitt Peak || Spacewatch || TIR || align=right | 2.6 km || 
|-id=636 bgcolor=#d6d6d6
| 392636 ||  || — || November 19, 2006 || Kitt Peak || Spacewatch || — || align=right | 3.5 km || 
|-id=637 bgcolor=#d6d6d6
| 392637 ||  || — || October 31, 2006 || Mount Lemmon || Mount Lemmon Survey || — || align=right | 2.3 km || 
|-id=638 bgcolor=#d6d6d6
| 392638 ||  || — || September 18, 2006 || Kitt Peak || Spacewatch || — || align=right | 2.2 km || 
|-id=639 bgcolor=#d6d6d6
| 392639 ||  || — || March 9, 2008 || Mount Lemmon || Mount Lemmon Survey || — || align=right | 3.6 km || 
|-id=640 bgcolor=#d6d6d6
| 392640 ||  || — || September 22, 2011 || Kitt Peak || Spacewatch || — || align=right | 2.9 km || 
|-id=641 bgcolor=#d6d6d6
| 392641 ||  || — || March 27, 2003 || Kitt Peak || Spacewatch || EOS || align=right | 2.2 km || 
|-id=642 bgcolor=#d6d6d6
| 392642 ||  || — || May 19, 2010 || WISE || WISE || — || align=right | 4.9 km || 
|-id=643 bgcolor=#fefefe
| 392643 ||  || — || April 9, 1999 || Kitt Peak || Spacewatch || — || align=right | 2.4 km || 
|-id=644 bgcolor=#E9E9E9
| 392644 ||  || — || September 18, 2006 || Kitt Peak || Spacewatch || — || align=right | 2.4 km || 
|-id=645 bgcolor=#d6d6d6
| 392645 ||  || — || April 18, 2009 || Mount Lemmon || Mount Lemmon Survey || — || align=right | 2.7 km || 
|-id=646 bgcolor=#d6d6d6
| 392646 ||  || — || October 23, 2011 || Mount Lemmon || Mount Lemmon Survey || — || align=right | 3.2 km || 
|-id=647 bgcolor=#d6d6d6
| 392647 ||  || — || October 25, 2005 || Kitt Peak || Spacewatch || — || align=right | 3.7 km || 
|-id=648 bgcolor=#d6d6d6
| 392648 ||  || — || October 4, 2006 || Mount Lemmon || Mount Lemmon Survey || NAE || align=right | 3.3 km || 
|-id=649 bgcolor=#d6d6d6
| 392649 ||  || — || October 23, 2006 || Kitt Peak || Spacewatch || — || align=right | 2.3 km || 
|-id=650 bgcolor=#E9E9E9
| 392650 ||  || — || March 23, 2001 || Kitt Peak || Spacewatch || — || align=right | 3.1 km || 
|-id=651 bgcolor=#E9E9E9
| 392651 ||  || — || September 12, 2006 || Siding Spring || SSS || — || align=right | 3.2 km || 
|-id=652 bgcolor=#d6d6d6
| 392652 ||  || — || April 17, 2009 || Kitt Peak || Spacewatch || TEL || align=right | 1.9 km || 
|-id=653 bgcolor=#E9E9E9
| 392653 ||  || — || April 17, 2005 || Kitt Peak || Spacewatch || — || align=right | 2.4 km || 
|-id=654 bgcolor=#d6d6d6
| 392654 ||  || — || April 1, 2009 || Kitt Peak || Spacewatch || — || align=right | 3.0 km || 
|-id=655 bgcolor=#d6d6d6
| 392655 Fengmin ||  ||  || March 25, 2009 || XuYi || PMO NEO || — || align=right | 3.3 km || 
|-id=656 bgcolor=#E9E9E9
| 392656 ||  || — || May 10, 2005 || Kitt Peak || Spacewatch || GEF || align=right | 1.5 km || 
|-id=657 bgcolor=#E9E9E9
| 392657 ||  || — || May 25, 2006 || Mount Lemmon || Mount Lemmon Survey || MIS || align=right | 2.4 km || 
|-id=658 bgcolor=#E9E9E9
| 392658 ||  || — || September 28, 2011 || Kitt Peak || Spacewatch || — || align=right | 2.9 km || 
|-id=659 bgcolor=#d6d6d6
| 392659 ||  || — || March 31, 2008 || Mount Lemmon || Mount Lemmon Survey || VER || align=right | 2.6 km || 
|-id=660 bgcolor=#d6d6d6
| 392660 ||  || — || November 14, 2006 || Kitt Peak || Spacewatch || TEL || align=right | 1.6 km || 
|-id=661 bgcolor=#d6d6d6
| 392661 ||  || — || April 29, 2009 || Kitt Peak || Spacewatch || — || align=right | 3.7 km || 
|-id=662 bgcolor=#d6d6d6
| 392662 ||  || — || September 3, 2010 || Mount Lemmon || Mount Lemmon Survey || 7:4 || align=right | 3.7 km || 
|-id=663 bgcolor=#E9E9E9
| 392663 ||  || — || August 6, 2006 || Anderson Mesa || LONEOS || EUN || align=right | 1.6 km || 
|-id=664 bgcolor=#E9E9E9
| 392664 ||  || — || July 18, 2006 || Siding Spring || SSS || — || align=right | 2.6 km || 
|-id=665 bgcolor=#E9E9E9
| 392665 ||  || — || October 14, 2007 || Mount Lemmon || Mount Lemmon Survey || — || align=right | 1.1 km || 
|-id=666 bgcolor=#d6d6d6
| 392666 ||  || — || January 19, 2002 || Kitt Peak || Spacewatch || — || align=right | 3.4 km || 
|-id=667 bgcolor=#d6d6d6
| 392667 ||  || — || May 14, 2009 || Mount Lemmon || Mount Lemmon Survey || ALA || align=right | 3.5 km || 
|-id=668 bgcolor=#d6d6d6
| 392668 ||  || — || November 25, 2000 || Kitt Peak || Spacewatch || — || align=right | 4.3 km || 
|-id=669 bgcolor=#d6d6d6
| 392669 ||  || — || April 22, 2010 || WISE || WISE || — || align=right | 3.2 km || 
|-id=670 bgcolor=#E9E9E9
| 392670 ||  || — || November 9, 2007 || Kitt Peak || Spacewatch || — || align=right | 2.7 km || 
|-id=671 bgcolor=#d6d6d6
| 392671 ||  || — || February 6, 2008 || Catalina || CSS || — || align=right | 3.8 km || 
|-id=672 bgcolor=#d6d6d6
| 392672 ||  || — || April 12, 2010 || WISE || WISE || — || align=right | 4.1 km || 
|-id=673 bgcolor=#E9E9E9
| 392673 ||  || — || October 16, 2007 || Mount Lemmon || Mount Lemmon Survey || — || align=right | 1.7 km || 
|-id=674 bgcolor=#E9E9E9
| 392674 ||  || — || September 7, 2011 || Kitt Peak || Spacewatch || — || align=right | 2.4 km || 
|-id=675 bgcolor=#d6d6d6
| 392675 ||  || — || November 10, 2006 || Kitt Peak || Spacewatch || CRO || align=right | 3.0 km || 
|-id=676 bgcolor=#d6d6d6
| 392676 ||  || — || November 19, 2006 || Kitt Peak || Spacewatch || URS || align=right | 3.3 km || 
|-id=677 bgcolor=#d6d6d6
| 392677 ||  || — || March 17, 2004 || Kitt Peak || Spacewatch || CHA || align=right | 2.0 km || 
|-id=678 bgcolor=#d6d6d6
| 392678 ||  || — || November 30, 2006 || Kitt Peak || Spacewatch || — || align=right | 3.7 km || 
|-id=679 bgcolor=#E9E9E9
| 392679 ||  || — || September 20, 2011 || Kitt Peak || Spacewatch || — || align=right | 2.2 km || 
|-id=680 bgcolor=#d6d6d6
| 392680 ||  || — || November 14, 2006 || Kitt Peak || Spacewatch || — || align=right | 2.9 km || 
|-id=681 bgcolor=#d6d6d6
| 392681 ||  || — || December 12, 2006 || Kitt Peak || Spacewatch || — || align=right | 2.6 km || 
|-id=682 bgcolor=#d6d6d6
| 392682 ||  || — || August 29, 2006 || Catalina || CSS || — || align=right | 2.5 km || 
|-id=683 bgcolor=#E9E9E9
| 392683 ||  || — || October 19, 2007 || Catalina || CSS || — || align=right | 1.1 km || 
|-id=684 bgcolor=#d6d6d6
| 392684 ||  || — || October 23, 2006 || Mount Lemmon || Mount Lemmon Survey || — || align=right | 3.7 km || 
|-id=685 bgcolor=#d6d6d6
| 392685 ||  || — || September 20, 2011 || Mount Lemmon || Mount Lemmon Survey || — || align=right | 3.4 km || 
|-id=686 bgcolor=#d6d6d6
| 392686 ||  || — || September 17, 2010 || Catalina || CSS || — || align=right | 3.8 km || 
|-id=687 bgcolor=#E9E9E9
| 392687 ||  || — || July 17, 1998 || Caussols || ODAS || — || align=right | 1.4 km || 
|-id=688 bgcolor=#d6d6d6
| 392688 ||  || — || April 20, 2009 || Mount Lemmon || Mount Lemmon Survey || — || align=right | 3.4 km || 
|-id=689 bgcolor=#fefefe
| 392689 ||  || — || April 24, 2000 || Kitt Peak || Spacewatch || FLO || align=right data-sort-value="0.55" | 550 m || 
|-id=690 bgcolor=#C2FFFF
| 392690 ||  || — || October 12, 2010 || Mount Lemmon || Mount Lemmon Survey || L4 || align=right | 7.9 km || 
|-id=691 bgcolor=#d6d6d6
| 392691 ||  || — || December 23, 2006 || Mount Lemmon || Mount Lemmon Survey || EOS || align=right | 2.2 km || 
|-id=692 bgcolor=#E9E9E9
| 392692 ||  || — || May 11, 2005 || Kitt Peak || Spacewatch || — || align=right | 2.9 km || 
|-id=693 bgcolor=#d6d6d6
| 392693 ||  || — || May 15, 2009 || Kitt Peak || Spacewatch || EOS || align=right | 3.1 km || 
|-id=694 bgcolor=#d6d6d6
| 392694 ||  || — || May 20, 2010 || WISE || WISE || — || align=right | 6.0 km || 
|-id=695 bgcolor=#d6d6d6
| 392695 ||  || — || November 10, 2005 || Mount Lemmon || Mount Lemmon Survey || SYL7:4 || align=right | 3.9 km || 
|-id=696 bgcolor=#d6d6d6
| 392696 ||  || — || November 12, 2005 || Kitt Peak || Spacewatch || 7:4* || align=right | 2.6 km || 
|-id=697 bgcolor=#E9E9E9
| 392697 ||  || — || March 12, 2010 || WISE || WISE || EUN || align=right | 2.3 km || 
|-id=698 bgcolor=#E9E9E9
| 392698 ||  || — || October 20, 2011 || Mount Lemmon || Mount Lemmon Survey || — || align=right | 2.9 km || 
|-id=699 bgcolor=#d6d6d6
| 392699 ||  || — || November 17, 2006 || Kitt Peak || Spacewatch || EOS || align=right | 2.6 km || 
|-id=700 bgcolor=#C2FFFF
| 392700 ||  || — || August 24, 2008 || Kitt Peak || Spacewatch || L4 || align=right | 8.0 km || 
|}

392701–392800 

|-bgcolor=#C2FFFF
| 392701 ||  || — || September 28, 2008 || Mount Lemmon || Mount Lemmon Survey || L4 || align=right | 7.7 km || 
|-id=702 bgcolor=#E9E9E9
| 392702 ||  || — || May 15, 2009 || Kitt Peak || Spacewatch || KON || align=right | 2.8 km || 
|-id=703 bgcolor=#C2FFFF
| 392703 ||  || — || November 2, 2010 || Mount Lemmon || Mount Lemmon Survey || L4ERY || align=right | 8.1 km || 
|-id=704 bgcolor=#FFC2E0
| 392704 ||  || — || April 18, 2007 || Mount Lemmon || Mount Lemmon Survey || APO || align=right data-sort-value="0.57" | 570 m || 
|-id=705 bgcolor=#d6d6d6
| 392705 ||  || — || March 19, 1996 || Kitt Peak || Spacewatch || — || align=right | 3.3 km || 
|-id=706 bgcolor=#fefefe
| 392706 ||  || — || December 15, 2004 || Campo Imperatore || CINEOS || V || align=right data-sort-value="0.81" | 810 m || 
|-id=707 bgcolor=#fefefe
| 392707 ||  || — || May 28, 2009 || Mount Lemmon || Mount Lemmon Survey || NYS || align=right data-sort-value="0.61" | 610 m || 
|-id=708 bgcolor=#fefefe
| 392708 ||  || — || October 16, 1977 || Palomar || PLS || ERI || align=right | 1.6 km || 
|-id=709 bgcolor=#d6d6d6
| 392709 ||  || — || February 13, 2002 || Kitt Peak || Spacewatch || — || align=right | 3.1 km || 
|-id=710 bgcolor=#d6d6d6
| 392710 ||  || — || August 8, 2004 || Socorro || LINEAR || — || align=right | 3.8 km || 
|-id=711 bgcolor=#fefefe
| 392711 ||  || — || March 10, 2005 || Catalina || CSS || — || align=right | 1.0 km || 
|-id=712 bgcolor=#C2FFFF
| 392712 ||  || — || February 2, 2010 || WISE || WISE || L4 || align=right | 13 km || 
|-id=713 bgcolor=#E9E9E9
| 392713 ||  || — || February 9, 2008 || Kitt Peak || Spacewatch || ADE || align=right | 2.4 km || 
|-id=714 bgcolor=#fefefe
| 392714 ||  || — || March 19, 2001 || Anderson Mesa || LONEOS || — || align=right data-sort-value="0.96" | 960 m || 
|-id=715 bgcolor=#fefefe
| 392715 ||  || — || February 8, 2008 || Mount Lemmon || Mount Lemmon Survey || — || align=right data-sort-value="0.92" | 920 m || 
|-id=716 bgcolor=#d6d6d6
| 392716 ||  || — || November 1, 2005 || Mount Lemmon || Mount Lemmon Survey || 615 || align=right | 1.9 km || 
|-id=717 bgcolor=#E9E9E9
| 392717 ||  || — || December 14, 1995 || Kitt Peak || Spacewatch || — || align=right | 2.7 km || 
|-id=718 bgcolor=#C2FFFF
| 392718 ||  || — || January 15, 2010 || WISE || WISE || L4 || align=right | 11 km || 
|-id=719 bgcolor=#d6d6d6
| 392719 ||  || — || October 19, 1998 || Kitt Peak || Spacewatch || — || align=right | 2.8 km || 
|-id=720 bgcolor=#fefefe
| 392720 ||  || — || September 6, 2007 || Siding Spring || SSS || H || align=right data-sort-value="0.65" | 650 m || 
|-id=721 bgcolor=#fefefe
| 392721 ||  || — || March 2, 1998 || Kitt Peak || Spacewatch || H || align=right data-sort-value="0.52" | 520 m || 
|-id=722 bgcolor=#fefefe
| 392722 ||  || — || September 14, 2007 || Catalina || CSS || H || align=right data-sort-value="0.57" | 570 m || 
|-id=723 bgcolor=#fefefe
| 392723 ||  || — || October 6, 2005 || Kitt Peak || Spacewatch || — || align=right data-sort-value="0.84" | 840 m || 
|-id=724 bgcolor=#fefefe
| 392724 ||  || — || December 10, 2009 || Mount Lemmon || Mount Lemmon Survey || — || align=right data-sort-value="0.78" | 780 m || 
|-id=725 bgcolor=#E9E9E9
| 392725 ||  || — || October 4, 2004 || Kitt Peak || Spacewatch || — || align=right data-sort-value="0.98" | 980 m || 
|-id=726 bgcolor=#E9E9E9
| 392726 ||  || — || August 12, 2012 || Siding Spring || SSS || EUN || align=right | 1.1 km || 
|-id=727 bgcolor=#fefefe
| 392727 ||  || — || September 11, 2004 || Socorro || LINEAR || H || align=right data-sort-value="0.58" | 580 m || 
|-id=728 bgcolor=#d6d6d6
| 392728 Zdzisławłączny ||  ||  || August 21, 2012 || Rantiga || M. Żołnowski, M. Kusiak || 615 || align=right | 1.5 km || 
|-id=729 bgcolor=#fefefe
| 392729 ||  || — || September 20, 2007 || Kitt Peak || Spacewatch || H || align=right data-sort-value="0.49" | 490 m || 
|-id=730 bgcolor=#fefefe
| 392730 ||  || — || January 23, 2006 || Catalina || CSS || — || align=right | 3.0 km || 
|-id=731 bgcolor=#fefefe
| 392731 ||  || — || April 8, 2006 || Catalina || CSS || H || align=right data-sort-value="0.82" | 820 m || 
|-id=732 bgcolor=#d6d6d6
| 392732 ||  || — || February 20, 2009 || Kitt Peak || Spacewatch || — || align=right | 3.4 km || 
|-id=733 bgcolor=#E9E9E9
| 392733 ||  || — || September 16, 1998 || Kitt Peak || Spacewatch || — || align=right | 2.4 km || 
|-id=734 bgcolor=#E9E9E9
| 392734 ||  || — || December 1, 2008 || Mount Lemmon || Mount Lemmon Survey || — || align=right | 2.0 km || 
|-id=735 bgcolor=#E9E9E9
| 392735 ||  || — || March 14, 2010 || Kitt Peak || Spacewatch || — || align=right | 2.4 km || 
|-id=736 bgcolor=#fefefe
| 392736 ||  || — || December 25, 2005 || Mount Lemmon || Mount Lemmon Survey || MAS || align=right data-sort-value="0.81" | 810 m || 
|-id=737 bgcolor=#E9E9E9
| 392737 ||  || — || September 10, 2004 || Socorro || LINEAR || — || align=right data-sort-value="0.99" | 990 m || 
|-id=738 bgcolor=#fefefe
| 392738 ||  || — || January 27, 2007 || Kitt Peak || Spacewatch || — || align=right data-sort-value="0.90" | 900 m || 
|-id=739 bgcolor=#E9E9E9
| 392739 ||  || — || September 18, 2003 || Kitt Peak || Spacewatch || GAL || align=right | 1.4 km || 
|-id=740 bgcolor=#E9E9E9
| 392740 ||  || — || February 24, 2006 || Kitt Peak || Spacewatch || — || align=right | 1.8 km || 
|-id=741 bgcolor=#fefefe
| 392741 ||  || — || December 27, 2009 || Kitt Peak || Spacewatch || FLO || align=right data-sort-value="0.67" | 670 m || 
|-id=742 bgcolor=#E9E9E9
| 392742 ||  || — || October 7, 2008 || Mount Lemmon || Mount Lemmon Survey || — || align=right | 1.9 km || 
|-id=743 bgcolor=#d6d6d6
| 392743 ||  || — || February 9, 2005 || Kitt Peak || Spacewatch || CHA || align=right | 1.9 km || 
|-id=744 bgcolor=#E9E9E9
| 392744 ||  || — || October 22, 2008 || Kitt Peak || Spacewatch || — || align=right | 1.2 km || 
|-id=745 bgcolor=#E9E9E9
| 392745 ||  || — || September 17, 2012 || Kitt Peak || Spacewatch || — || align=right | 1.9 km || 
|-id=746 bgcolor=#fefefe
| 392746 ||  || — || October 9, 2002 || Socorro || LINEAR || — || align=right data-sort-value="0.93" | 930 m || 
|-id=747 bgcolor=#fefefe
| 392747 ||  || — || September 20, 2001 || Socorro || LINEAR || FLO || align=right data-sort-value="0.75" | 750 m || 
|-id=748 bgcolor=#fefefe
| 392748 ||  || — || October 1, 2005 || Kitt Peak || Spacewatch || — || align=right data-sort-value="0.86" | 860 m || 
|-id=749 bgcolor=#fefefe
| 392749 ||  || — || December 1, 2006 || Mount Lemmon || Mount Lemmon Survey || — || align=right data-sort-value="0.54" | 540 m || 
|-id=750 bgcolor=#fefefe
| 392750 ||  || — || September 23, 2008 || Mount Lemmon || Mount Lemmon Survey || — || align=right | 1.1 km || 
|-id=751 bgcolor=#fefefe
| 392751 ||  || — || September 12, 2005 || Kitt Peak || Spacewatch || — || align=right data-sort-value="0.83" | 830 m || 
|-id=752 bgcolor=#E9E9E9
| 392752 ||  || — || March 18, 2010 || Mount Lemmon || Mount Lemmon Survey || — || align=right | 1.8 km || 
|-id=753 bgcolor=#E9E9E9
| 392753 ||  || — || May 23, 2006 || Kitt Peak || Spacewatch || EUN || align=right | 1.2 km || 
|-id=754 bgcolor=#fefefe
| 392754 ||  || — || November 5, 1999 || Kitt Peak || Spacewatch || H || align=right data-sort-value="0.63" | 630 m || 
|-id=755 bgcolor=#fefefe
| 392755 ||  || — || December 7, 2005 || Kitt Peak || Spacewatch || MAS || align=right data-sort-value="0.66" | 660 m || 
|-id=756 bgcolor=#E9E9E9
| 392756 ||  || — || October 10, 2004 || Kitt Peak || Spacewatch || — || align=right | 1.0 km || 
|-id=757 bgcolor=#fefefe
| 392757 ||  || — || October 24, 2009 || Kitt Peak || Spacewatch || — || align=right data-sort-value="0.58" | 580 m || 
|-id=758 bgcolor=#fefefe
| 392758 ||  || — || November 30, 2005 || Mount Lemmon || Mount Lemmon Survey || NYS || align=right data-sort-value="0.59" | 590 m || 
|-id=759 bgcolor=#fefefe
| 392759 ||  || — || March 11, 2011 || Mount Lemmon || Mount Lemmon Survey || — || align=right data-sort-value="0.94" | 940 m || 
|-id=760 bgcolor=#C2FFFF
| 392760 ||  || — || December 2, 2005 || Kitt Peak || L. H. Wasserman || L5 || align=right | 6.7 km || 
|-id=761 bgcolor=#fefefe
| 392761 ||  || — || February 16, 2007 || Mount Lemmon || Mount Lemmon Survey || — || align=right data-sort-value="0.87" | 870 m || 
|-id=762 bgcolor=#E9E9E9
| 392762 ||  || — || October 19, 1995 || Kitt Peak || Spacewatch || BAR || align=right | 1.4 km || 
|-id=763 bgcolor=#E9E9E9
| 392763 ||  || — || April 10, 2010 || Mount Lemmon || Mount Lemmon Survey || — || align=right | 1.0 km || 
|-id=764 bgcolor=#E9E9E9
| 392764 ||  || — || May 27, 2006 || Kitt Peak || Spacewatch || HNS || align=right | 1.2 km || 
|-id=765 bgcolor=#E9E9E9
| 392765 ||  || — || October 25, 2008 || Kitt Peak || Spacewatch || — || align=right | 1.2 km || 
|-id=766 bgcolor=#E9E9E9
| 392766 ||  || — || September 29, 2008 || Mount Lemmon || Mount Lemmon Survey || — || align=right | 1.8 km || 
|-id=767 bgcolor=#fefefe
| 392767 ||  || — || April 28, 2000 || Kitt Peak || Spacewatch || H || align=right data-sort-value="0.96" | 960 m || 
|-id=768 bgcolor=#fefefe
| 392768 ||  || — || July 4, 2005 || Kitt Peak || Spacewatch || — || align=right data-sort-value="0.84" | 840 m || 
|-id=769 bgcolor=#E9E9E9
| 392769 ||  || — || September 30, 2003 || Kitt Peak || Spacewatch || — || align=right | 2.1 km || 
|-id=770 bgcolor=#fefefe
| 392770 ||  || — || October 27, 2005 || Kitt Peak || Spacewatch || — || align=right data-sort-value="0.81" | 810 m || 
|-id=771 bgcolor=#E9E9E9
| 392771 ||  || — || March 11, 2005 || Mount Lemmon || Mount Lemmon Survey || — || align=right | 2.2 km || 
|-id=772 bgcolor=#fefefe
| 392772 ||  || — || October 29, 2005 || Mount Lemmon || Mount Lemmon Survey || MAS || align=right data-sort-value="0.72" | 720 m || 
|-id=773 bgcolor=#E9E9E9
| 392773 ||  || — || April 7, 2006 || Mount Lemmon || Mount Lemmon Survey || GER || align=right | 1.4 km || 
|-id=774 bgcolor=#fefefe
| 392774 ||  || — || March 11, 2007 || Kitt Peak || Spacewatch || — || align=right data-sort-value="0.72" | 720 m || 
|-id=775 bgcolor=#fefefe
| 392775 ||  || — || December 2, 2005 || Kitt Peak || Spacewatch || ERI || align=right | 2.1 km || 
|-id=776 bgcolor=#E9E9E9
| 392776 ||  || — || March 8, 2005 || Mount Lemmon || Mount Lemmon Survey || — || align=right | 1.4 km || 
|-id=777 bgcolor=#E9E9E9
| 392777 ||  || — || May 5, 2006 || Kitt Peak || Spacewatch || — || align=right | 1.5 km || 
|-id=778 bgcolor=#fefefe
| 392778 ||  || — || November 16, 2006 || Mount Lemmon || Mount Lemmon Survey || — || align=right data-sort-value="0.66" | 660 m || 
|-id=779 bgcolor=#fefefe
| 392779 ||  || — || April 25, 2004 || Kitt Peak || Spacewatch || — || align=right data-sort-value="0.87" | 870 m || 
|-id=780 bgcolor=#E9E9E9
| 392780 ||  || — || April 13, 2002 || Kitt Peak || Spacewatch || — || align=right | 1.0 km || 
|-id=781 bgcolor=#E9E9E9
| 392781 ||  || — || January 15, 2005 || Catalina || CSS || JUN || align=right | 1.1 km || 
|-id=782 bgcolor=#fefefe
| 392782 ||  || — || November 20, 2009 || Kitt Peak || Spacewatch || — || align=right data-sort-value="0.74" | 740 m || 
|-id=783 bgcolor=#E9E9E9
| 392783 ||  || — || September 30, 2003 || Kitt Peak || Spacewatch || — || align=right | 2.2 km || 
|-id=784 bgcolor=#E9E9E9
| 392784 ||  || — || December 14, 2004 || Socorro || LINEAR || — || align=right data-sort-value="0.94" | 940 m || 
|-id=785 bgcolor=#E9E9E9
| 392785 ||  || — || November 3, 2008 || Catalina || CSS || BRG || align=right | 1.7 km || 
|-id=786 bgcolor=#fefefe
| 392786 ||  || — || December 2, 2005 || Kitt Peak || Spacewatch || NYS || align=right data-sort-value="0.63" | 630 m || 
|-id=787 bgcolor=#d6d6d6
| 392787 ||  || — || September 25, 2007 || Mount Lemmon || Mount Lemmon Survey || — || align=right | 2.0 km || 
|-id=788 bgcolor=#fefefe
| 392788 ||  || — || April 16, 2007 || Mount Lemmon || Mount Lemmon Survey || V || align=right data-sort-value="0.66" | 660 m || 
|-id=789 bgcolor=#E9E9E9
| 392789 ||  || — || January 16, 2010 || WISE || WISE || ADE || align=right | 1.6 km || 
|-id=790 bgcolor=#fefefe
| 392790 ||  || — || December 24, 2005 || Kitt Peak || Spacewatch || — || align=right data-sort-value="0.79" | 790 m || 
|-id=791 bgcolor=#fefefe
| 392791 ||  || — || March 13, 2007 || Mount Lemmon || Mount Lemmon Survey || V || align=right data-sort-value="0.65" | 650 m || 
|-id=792 bgcolor=#fefefe
| 392792 ||  || — || February 15, 2010 || Mount Lemmon || Mount Lemmon Survey || NYS || align=right data-sort-value="0.50" | 500 m || 
|-id=793 bgcolor=#E9E9E9
| 392793 ||  || — || November 20, 2003 || Socorro || LINEAR || CLO || align=right | 2.2 km || 
|-id=794 bgcolor=#E9E9E9
| 392794 ||  || — || April 5, 2010 || Kitt Peak || Spacewatch || HNS || align=right | 1.3 km || 
|-id=795 bgcolor=#d6d6d6
| 392795 ||  || — || March 18, 2004 || Kitt Peak || Spacewatch || — || align=right | 2.9 km || 
|-id=796 bgcolor=#fefefe
| 392796 ||  || — || March 21, 2004 || Kitt Peak || Spacewatch || — || align=right data-sort-value="0.98" | 980 m || 
|-id=797 bgcolor=#E9E9E9
| 392797 ||  || — || February 18, 2010 || Mount Lemmon || Mount Lemmon Survey || — || align=right | 2.2 km || 
|-id=798 bgcolor=#E9E9E9
| 392798 ||  || — || September 19, 2012 || Mount Lemmon || Mount Lemmon Survey || — || align=right | 2.5 km || 
|-id=799 bgcolor=#fefefe
| 392799 ||  || — || December 1, 2005 || Kitt Peak || Spacewatch || V || align=right data-sort-value="0.73" | 730 m || 
|-id=800 bgcolor=#E9E9E9
| 392800 ||  || — || March 24, 2006 || Mount Lemmon || Mount Lemmon Survey || — || align=right data-sort-value="0.99" | 990 m || 
|}

392801–392900 

|-bgcolor=#E9E9E9
| 392801 ||  || — || February 26, 2001 || Cima Ekar || ADAS || EUN || align=right | 1.3 km || 
|-id=802 bgcolor=#E9E9E9
| 392802 ||  || — || November 20, 2008 || Mount Lemmon || Mount Lemmon Survey || — || align=right | 1.4 km || 
|-id=803 bgcolor=#E9E9E9
| 392803 ||  || — || October 26, 2008 || Kitt Peak || Spacewatch || KON || align=right | 2.8 km || 
|-id=804 bgcolor=#d6d6d6
| 392804 ||  || — || October 10, 2007 || Catalina || CSS || — || align=right | 3.8 km || 
|-id=805 bgcolor=#fefefe
| 392805 ||  || — || October 11, 1997 || Kitt Peak || Spacewatch || NYS || align=right data-sort-value="0.77" | 770 m || 
|-id=806 bgcolor=#E9E9E9
| 392806 ||  || — || November 19, 1996 || Kitt Peak || Spacewatch || — || align=right | 1.1 km || 
|-id=807 bgcolor=#E9E9E9
| 392807 ||  || — || September 10, 2007 || Kitt Peak || Spacewatch || WIT || align=right data-sort-value="0.89" | 890 m || 
|-id=808 bgcolor=#E9E9E9
| 392808 ||  || — || August 21, 2003 || Campo Imperatore || CINEOS || EUN || align=right | 1.3 km || 
|-id=809 bgcolor=#E9E9E9
| 392809 ||  || — || April 10, 2010 || Mount Lemmon || Mount Lemmon Survey || — || align=right | 1.4 km || 
|-id=810 bgcolor=#fefefe
| 392810 ||  || — || June 24, 2011 || Mount Lemmon || Mount Lemmon Survey || — || align=right data-sort-value="0.81" | 810 m || 
|-id=811 bgcolor=#E9E9E9
| 392811 ||  || — || February 17, 2010 || Kitt Peak || Spacewatch || — || align=right data-sort-value="0.94" | 940 m || 
|-id=812 bgcolor=#d6d6d6
| 392812 ||  || — || August 28, 2012 || Mount Lemmon || Mount Lemmon Survey || — || align=right | 2.1 km || 
|-id=813 bgcolor=#E9E9E9
| 392813 ||  || — || December 1, 2008 || Mount Lemmon || Mount Lemmon Survey || — || align=right | 1.8 km || 
|-id=814 bgcolor=#fefefe
| 392814 ||  || — || April 25, 2004 || Kitt Peak || Spacewatch || — || align=right data-sort-value="0.76" | 760 m || 
|-id=815 bgcolor=#fefefe
| 392815 ||  || — || September 6, 2008 || Mount Lemmon || Mount Lemmon Survey || — || align=right data-sort-value="0.84" | 840 m || 
|-id=816 bgcolor=#fefefe
| 392816 ||  || — || October 5, 2012 || Kitt Peak || Spacewatch || H || align=right data-sort-value="0.74" | 740 m || 
|-id=817 bgcolor=#E9E9E9
| 392817 ||  || — || January 13, 1996 || Kitt Peak || Spacewatch || — || align=right | 1.0 km || 
|-id=818 bgcolor=#E9E9E9
| 392818 ||  || — || May 4, 2006 || Kitt Peak || Spacewatch || EUN || align=right | 1.2 km || 
|-id=819 bgcolor=#E9E9E9
| 392819 ||  || — || November 20, 2003 || Socorro || LINEAR || — || align=right | 2.2 km || 
|-id=820 bgcolor=#d6d6d6
| 392820 ||  || — || March 4, 1994 || Kitt Peak || Spacewatch || — || align=right | 2.1 km || 
|-id=821 bgcolor=#E9E9E9
| 392821 ||  || — || October 14, 2012 || Kitt Peak || Spacewatch || — || align=right | 1.6 km || 
|-id=822 bgcolor=#E9E9E9
| 392822 ||  || — || September 25, 1998 || Kitt Peak || Spacewatch || NEM || align=right | 2.0 km || 
|-id=823 bgcolor=#E9E9E9
| 392823 ||  || — || November 24, 2008 || Mount Lemmon || Mount Lemmon Survey || — || align=right | 2.5 km || 
|-id=824 bgcolor=#fefefe
| 392824 ||  || — || September 13, 2005 || Kitt Peak || Spacewatch || — || align=right data-sort-value="0.85" | 850 m || 
|-id=825 bgcolor=#E9E9E9
| 392825 ||  || — || October 20, 2003 || Kitt Peak || Spacewatch || — || align=right | 2.2 km || 
|-id=826 bgcolor=#E9E9E9
| 392826 ||  || — || August 24, 2007 || Kitt Peak || Spacewatch || MRX || align=right data-sort-value="0.96" | 960 m || 
|-id=827 bgcolor=#fefefe
| 392827 ||  || — || April 14, 1997 || Kitt Peak || Spacewatch || — || align=right data-sort-value="0.90" | 900 m || 
|-id=828 bgcolor=#E9E9E9
| 392828 ||  || — || November 19, 2008 || Mount Lemmon || Mount Lemmon Survey || EUN || align=right | 1.3 km || 
|-id=829 bgcolor=#E9E9E9
| 392829 ||  || — || May 25, 2006 || Kitt Peak || Spacewatch || GEF || align=right | 1.5 km || 
|-id=830 bgcolor=#d6d6d6
| 392830 ||  || — || August 28, 2006 || Kitt Peak || Spacewatch || — || align=right | 2.4 km || 
|-id=831 bgcolor=#E9E9E9
| 392831 ||  || — || January 20, 2009 || Socorro || LINEAR || — || align=right | 3.1 km || 
|-id=832 bgcolor=#fefefe
| 392832 ||  || — || November 12, 2001 || Socorro || LINEAR || — || align=right | 1.1 km || 
|-id=833 bgcolor=#fefefe
| 392833 ||  || — || February 16, 2010 || Mount Lemmon || Mount Lemmon Survey || — || align=right | 1.2 km || 
|-id=834 bgcolor=#E9E9E9
| 392834 ||  || — || November 21, 2008 || Kitt Peak || Spacewatch || JUN || align=right | 1.5 km || 
|-id=835 bgcolor=#fefefe
| 392835 ||  || — || April 12, 2004 || Kitt Peak || Spacewatch || — || align=right data-sort-value="0.73" | 730 m || 
|-id=836 bgcolor=#fefefe
| 392836 ||  || — || June 12, 1997 || Kitt Peak || Spacewatch || — || align=right data-sort-value="0.90" | 900 m || 
|-id=837 bgcolor=#fefefe
| 392837 ||  || — || December 10, 2005 || Kitt Peak || Spacewatch || NYS || align=right data-sort-value="0.68" | 680 m || 
|-id=838 bgcolor=#E9E9E9
| 392838 ||  || — || April 17, 2010 || Mount Lemmon || Mount Lemmon Survey || — || align=right | 1.3 km || 
|-id=839 bgcolor=#fefefe
| 392839 ||  || — || September 4, 2008 || Kitt Peak || Spacewatch || V || align=right data-sort-value="0.83" | 830 m || 
|-id=840 bgcolor=#fefefe
| 392840 ||  || — || January 10, 2007 || Kitt Peak || Spacewatch || — || align=right data-sort-value="0.89" | 890 m || 
|-id=841 bgcolor=#E9E9E9
| 392841 ||  || — || March 23, 2006 || Mount Lemmon || Mount Lemmon Survey || — || align=right | 1.7 km || 
|-id=842 bgcolor=#E9E9E9
| 392842 ||  || — || December 16, 2004 || Kitt Peak || Spacewatch || — || align=right | 1.7 km || 
|-id=843 bgcolor=#fefefe
| 392843 ||  || — || June 4, 2011 || Mount Lemmon || Mount Lemmon Survey || — || align=right data-sort-value="0.75" | 750 m || 
|-id=844 bgcolor=#d6d6d6
| 392844 ||  || — || August 26, 2001 || Anderson Mesa || LONEOS || — || align=right | 3.6 km || 
|-id=845 bgcolor=#fefefe
| 392845 ||  || — || October 22, 2005 || Kitt Peak || Spacewatch || FLO || align=right data-sort-value="0.71" | 710 m || 
|-id=846 bgcolor=#fefefe
| 392846 ||  || — || October 25, 2005 || Anderson Mesa || LONEOS || — || align=right | 1.0 km || 
|-id=847 bgcolor=#E9E9E9
| 392847 ||  || — || November 30, 2008 || Kitt Peak || Spacewatch || PAD || align=right | 1.6 km || 
|-id=848 bgcolor=#E9E9E9
| 392848 ||  || — || December 30, 2008 || Mount Lemmon || Mount Lemmon Survey || HEN || align=right data-sort-value="0.98" | 980 m || 
|-id=849 bgcolor=#d6d6d6
| 392849 ||  || — || October 14, 2001 || Socorro || LINEAR || — || align=right | 2.7 km || 
|-id=850 bgcolor=#E9E9E9
| 392850 ||  || — || October 22, 2003 || Kitt Peak || Spacewatch || NEM || align=right | 1.9 km || 
|-id=851 bgcolor=#d6d6d6
| 392851 ||  || — || October 15, 2001 || Kitt Peak || Spacewatch || EOS || align=right | 2.4 km || 
|-id=852 bgcolor=#fefefe
| 392852 ||  || — || April 13, 2004 || Kitt Peak || Spacewatch || — || align=right | 1.0 km || 
|-id=853 bgcolor=#d6d6d6
| 392853 ||  || — || January 1, 2008 || Catalina || CSS || — || align=right | 2.9 km || 
|-id=854 bgcolor=#fefefe
| 392854 ||  || — || April 28, 2003 || Kitt Peak || Spacewatch || NYS || align=right data-sort-value="0.86" | 860 m || 
|-id=855 bgcolor=#E9E9E9
| 392855 ||  || — || December 31, 2008 || Catalina || CSS || — || align=right | 1.9 km || 
|-id=856 bgcolor=#E9E9E9
| 392856 ||  || — || October 21, 2008 || Kitt Peak || Spacewatch || — || align=right | 1.3 km || 
|-id=857 bgcolor=#fefefe
| 392857 ||  || — || April 18, 2007 || Kitt Peak || Spacewatch || — || align=right data-sort-value="0.73" | 730 m || 
|-id=858 bgcolor=#fefefe
| 392858 ||  || — || April 18, 2007 || Kitt Peak || Spacewatch || — || align=right | 2.2 km || 
|-id=859 bgcolor=#fefefe
| 392859 ||  || — || November 6, 2005 || Kitt Peak || Spacewatch || V || align=right data-sort-value="0.74" | 740 m || 
|-id=860 bgcolor=#d6d6d6
| 392860 ||  || — || December 3, 2007 || Kitt Peak || Spacewatch || THM || align=right | 1.9 km || 
|-id=861 bgcolor=#d6d6d6
| 392861 ||  || — || November 11, 2007 || Mount Lemmon || Mount Lemmon Survey || THM || align=right | 2.1 km || 
|-id=862 bgcolor=#E9E9E9
| 392862 ||  || — || November 19, 2003 || Anderson Mesa || LONEOS || — || align=right | 2.9 km || 
|-id=863 bgcolor=#fefefe
| 392863 ||  || — || September 5, 2002 || Anderson Mesa || LONEOS || — || align=right data-sort-value="0.94" | 940 m || 
|-id=864 bgcolor=#E9E9E9
| 392864 ||  || — || April 7, 2006 || Kitt Peak || Spacewatch || EUN || align=right | 1.5 km || 
|-id=865 bgcolor=#E9E9E9
| 392865 ||  || — || October 11, 2007 || Kitt Peak || Spacewatch || — || align=right | 2.4 km || 
|-id=866 bgcolor=#fefefe
| 392866 ||  || — || October 1, 2008 || Mount Lemmon || Mount Lemmon Survey || — || align=right | 1.1 km || 
|-id=867 bgcolor=#E9E9E9
| 392867 ||  || — || January 9, 2005 || Catalina || CSS || EUN || align=right | 1.4 km || 
|-id=868 bgcolor=#fefefe
| 392868 ||  || — || February 23, 2007 || Kitt Peak || Spacewatch || FLO || align=right data-sort-value="0.73" | 730 m || 
|-id=869 bgcolor=#E9E9E9
| 392869 ||  || — || February 2, 2005 || Kitt Peak || Spacewatch || — || align=right | 1.2 km || 
|-id=870 bgcolor=#d6d6d6
| 392870 ||  || — || November 5, 2007 || Kitt Peak || Spacewatch || THM || align=right | 1.7 km || 
|-id=871 bgcolor=#fefefe
| 392871 ||  || — || October 9, 2008 || Mount Lemmon || Mount Lemmon Survey || — || align=right | 1.1 km || 
|-id=872 bgcolor=#E9E9E9
| 392872 ||  || — || April 7, 2006 || Kitt Peak || Spacewatch || — || align=right | 1.8 km || 
|-id=873 bgcolor=#fefefe
| 392873 ||  || — || November 21, 2009 || Kitt Peak || Spacewatch || — || align=right data-sort-value="0.73" | 730 m || 
|-id=874 bgcolor=#E9E9E9
| 392874 ||  || — || October 25, 2003 || Kitt Peak || Spacewatch || — || align=right | 2.0 km || 
|-id=875 bgcolor=#E9E9E9
| 392875 ||  || — || November 18, 2003 || Kitt Peak || Spacewatch || — || align=right | 1.9 km || 
|-id=876 bgcolor=#fefefe
| 392876 ||  || — || October 24, 2005 || Kitt Peak || Spacewatch || V || align=right data-sort-value="0.68" | 680 m || 
|-id=877 bgcolor=#E9E9E9
| 392877 ||  || — || December 10, 2004 || Kitt Peak || Spacewatch || — || align=right data-sort-value="0.95" | 950 m || 
|-id=878 bgcolor=#E9E9E9
| 392878 ||  || — || October 21, 2008 || Mount Lemmon || Mount Lemmon Survey || EUN || align=right | 1.0 km || 
|-id=879 bgcolor=#d6d6d6
| 392879 ||  || — || April 26, 2009 || Siding Spring || SSS || EUP || align=right | 4.4 km || 
|-id=880 bgcolor=#E9E9E9
| 392880 ||  || — || April 11, 2005 || Mount Lemmon || Mount Lemmon Survey || — || align=right | 2.5 km || 
|-id=881 bgcolor=#fefefe
| 392881 ||  || — || November 3, 2005 || Mount Lemmon || Mount Lemmon Survey || — || align=right | 1.1 km || 
|-id=882 bgcolor=#fefefe
| 392882 ||  || — || August 23, 2008 || Kitt Peak || Spacewatch || — || align=right data-sort-value="0.90" | 900 m || 
|-id=883 bgcolor=#fefefe
| 392883 ||  || — || November 11, 2007 || Mount Lemmon || Mount Lemmon Survey || H || align=right data-sort-value="0.83" | 830 m || 
|-id=884 bgcolor=#E9E9E9
| 392884 ||  || — || October 8, 2007 || Kitt Peak || Spacewatch || — || align=right | 1.7 km || 
|-id=885 bgcolor=#d6d6d6
| 392885 ||  || — || September 27, 2006 || Kitt Peak || Spacewatch || — || align=right | 2.5 km || 
|-id=886 bgcolor=#fefefe
| 392886 ||  || — || June 4, 2011 || Mount Lemmon || Mount Lemmon Survey || — || align=right data-sort-value="0.82" | 820 m || 
|-id=887 bgcolor=#E9E9E9
| 392887 ||  || — || November 21, 2003 || Socorro || LINEAR || — || align=right | 3.2 km || 
|-id=888 bgcolor=#fefefe
| 392888 ||  || — || May 15, 2001 || Anderson Mesa || LONEOS || — || align=right | 1.1 km || 
|-id=889 bgcolor=#fefefe
| 392889 ||  || — || June 9, 2007 || Kitt Peak || Spacewatch || V || align=right data-sort-value="0.78" | 780 m || 
|-id=890 bgcolor=#E9E9E9
| 392890 ||  || — || November 30, 2008 || Kitt Peak || Spacewatch || — || align=right | 1.4 km || 
|-id=891 bgcolor=#fefefe
| 392891 ||  || — || December 18, 2009 || Mount Lemmon || Mount Lemmon Survey || — || align=right data-sort-value="0.84" | 840 m || 
|-id=892 bgcolor=#E9E9E9
| 392892 ||  || — || December 18, 2004 || Kitt Peak || Spacewatch || — || align=right | 1.0 km || 
|-id=893 bgcolor=#E9E9E9
| 392893 ||  || — || September 12, 2007 || Anderson Mesa || LONEOS || WIT || align=right | 1.2 km || 
|-id=894 bgcolor=#d6d6d6
| 392894 ||  || — || September 25, 2006 || Kitt Peak || Spacewatch || LIX || align=right | 3.2 km || 
|-id=895 bgcolor=#fefefe
| 392895 ||  || — || September 23, 2005 || Kitt Peak || Spacewatch || — || align=right data-sort-value="0.86" | 860 m || 
|-id=896 bgcolor=#d6d6d6
| 392896 ||  || — || November 14, 2007 || Kitt Peak || Spacewatch || KOR || align=right | 1.3 km || 
|-id=897 bgcolor=#d6d6d6
| 392897 ||  || — || March 22, 2009 || Mount Lemmon || Mount Lemmon Survey || — || align=right | 2.9 km || 
|-id=898 bgcolor=#E9E9E9
| 392898 ||  || — || October 30, 2008 || Mount Lemmon || Mount Lemmon Survey || — || align=right | 1.7 km || 
|-id=899 bgcolor=#E9E9E9
| 392899 ||  || — || December 1, 2008 || Kitt Peak || Spacewatch || — || align=right | 1.3 km || 
|-id=900 bgcolor=#d6d6d6
| 392900 ||  || — || November 8, 2007 || Mount Lemmon || Mount Lemmon Survey || — || align=right | 2.4 km || 
|}

392901–393000 

|-bgcolor=#E9E9E9
| 392901 ||  || — || September 19, 2007 || Kitt Peak || Spacewatch || HEN || align=right data-sort-value="0.91" | 910 m || 
|-id=902 bgcolor=#d6d6d6
| 392902 ||  || — || December 17, 2001 || Socorro || LINEAR || — || align=right | 3.2 km || 
|-id=903 bgcolor=#E9E9E9
| 392903 ||  || — || December 29, 2008 || Mount Lemmon || Mount Lemmon Survey || — || align=right | 1.8 km || 
|-id=904 bgcolor=#d6d6d6
| 392904 ||  || — || May 14, 2004 || Kitt Peak || Spacewatch || — || align=right | 3.3 km || 
|-id=905 bgcolor=#E9E9E9
| 392905 ||  || — || May 25, 2006 || Kitt Peak || Spacewatch || — || align=right | 1.7 km || 
|-id=906 bgcolor=#fefefe
| 392906 ||  || — || November 19, 2009 || Kitt Peak || Spacewatch || — || align=right data-sort-value="0.68" | 680 m || 
|-id=907 bgcolor=#E9E9E9
| 392907 ||  || — || October 16, 2003 || Anderson Mesa || LONEOS || — || align=right | 2.3 km || 
|-id=908 bgcolor=#E9E9E9
| 392908 ||  || — || November 18, 2008 || Kitt Peak || Spacewatch || — || align=right data-sort-value="0.92" | 920 m || 
|-id=909 bgcolor=#E9E9E9
| 392909 ||  || — || October 23, 2003 || Kitt Peak || Spacewatch || — || align=right | 2.0 km || 
|-id=910 bgcolor=#E9E9E9
| 392910 ||  || — || April 17, 2005 || Kitt Peak || Spacewatch || — || align=right | 2.7 km || 
|-id=911 bgcolor=#fefefe
| 392911 ||  || — || October 17, 1995 || Kitt Peak || Spacewatch || NYS || align=right data-sort-value="0.63" | 630 m || 
|-id=912 bgcolor=#E9E9E9
| 392912 ||  || — || March 20, 2010 || Kitt Peak || Spacewatch || GER || align=right | 1.7 km || 
|-id=913 bgcolor=#fefefe
| 392913 ||  || — || February 16, 2010 || Kitt Peak || Spacewatch || — || align=right data-sort-value="0.99" | 990 m || 
|-id=914 bgcolor=#E9E9E9
| 392914 ||  || — || February 1, 2001 || Kitt Peak || Spacewatch || — || align=right | 1.2 km || 
|-id=915 bgcolor=#E9E9E9
| 392915 ||  || — || September 20, 2007 || Kitt Peak || Spacewatch || AGN || align=right | 1.3 km || 
|-id=916 bgcolor=#fefefe
| 392916 ||  || — || March 10, 2007 || Mount Lemmon || Mount Lemmon Survey || V || align=right data-sort-value="0.73" | 730 m || 
|-id=917 bgcolor=#fefefe
| 392917 ||  || — || August 24, 2008 || Kitt Peak || Spacewatch || — || align=right data-sort-value="0.77" | 770 m || 
|-id=918 bgcolor=#d6d6d6
| 392918 ||  || — || December 15, 2007 || Mount Lemmon || Mount Lemmon Survey || — || align=right | 2.8 km || 
|-id=919 bgcolor=#fefefe
| 392919 ||  || — || May 10, 2007 || Mount Lemmon || Mount Lemmon Survey || V || align=right data-sort-value="0.89" | 890 m || 
|-id=920 bgcolor=#E9E9E9
| 392920 ||  || — || April 21, 2006 || Kitt Peak || Spacewatch || — || align=right | 1.1 km || 
|-id=921 bgcolor=#d6d6d6
| 392921 ||  || — || December 16, 2007 || Mount Lemmon || Mount Lemmon Survey || — || align=right | 2.9 km || 
|-id=922 bgcolor=#E9E9E9
| 392922 ||  || — || December 30, 2000 || Kitt Peak || Spacewatch || — || align=right | 1.0 km || 
|-id=923 bgcolor=#E9E9E9
| 392923 ||  || — || January 6, 2005 || Catalina || CSS || — || align=right | 1.4 km || 
|-id=924 bgcolor=#fefefe
| 392924 ||  || — || April 20, 2007 || Kitt Peak || Spacewatch || V || align=right data-sort-value="0.70" | 700 m || 
|-id=925 bgcolor=#fefefe
| 392925 ||  || — || November 6, 2012 || Kitt Peak || Spacewatch || V || align=right data-sort-value="0.73" | 730 m || 
|-id=926 bgcolor=#E9E9E9
| 392926 ||  || — || May 2, 2006 || Mount Lemmon || Mount Lemmon Survey || — || align=right | 1.7 km || 
|-id=927 bgcolor=#E9E9E9
| 392927 ||  || — || December 22, 2003 || Socorro || LINEAR || DOR || align=right | 2.7 km || 
|-id=928 bgcolor=#d6d6d6
| 392928 ||  || — || December 5, 2008 || Mount Lemmon || Mount Lemmon Survey || TEL || align=right | 1.8 km || 
|-id=929 bgcolor=#E9E9E9
| 392929 ||  || — || December 4, 2008 || Mount Lemmon || Mount Lemmon Survey || — || align=right | 1.3 km || 
|-id=930 bgcolor=#d6d6d6
| 392930 ||  || — || November 14, 2007 || Kitt Peak || Spacewatch || — || align=right | 2.6 km || 
|-id=931 bgcolor=#E9E9E9
| 392931 ||  || — || April 10, 2010 || Mount Lemmon || Mount Lemmon Survey || — || align=right data-sort-value="0.98" | 980 m || 
|-id=932 bgcolor=#E9E9E9
| 392932 ||  || — || March 24, 2006 || Kitt Peak || Spacewatch || — || align=right | 1.5 km || 
|-id=933 bgcolor=#d6d6d6
| 392933 ||  || — || October 15, 2001 || Kitt Peak || Spacewatch || — || align=right | 2.7 km || 
|-id=934 bgcolor=#E9E9E9
| 392934 ||  || — || October 1, 2003 || Kitt Peak || Spacewatch || — || align=right | 1.2 km || 
|-id=935 bgcolor=#E9E9E9
| 392935 ||  || — || January 16, 2005 || Kitt Peak || Spacewatch || — || align=right | 1.2 km || 
|-id=936 bgcolor=#E9E9E9
| 392936 ||  || — || January 15, 2009 || Kitt Peak || Spacewatch || — || align=right | 1.7 km || 
|-id=937 bgcolor=#E9E9E9
| 392937 ||  || — || October 24, 2008 || Kitt Peak || Spacewatch || — || align=right | 1.1 km || 
|-id=938 bgcolor=#E9E9E9
| 392938 ||  || — || February 20, 2002 || Kitt Peak || Spacewatch || — || align=right data-sort-value="0.83" | 830 m || 
|-id=939 bgcolor=#E9E9E9
| 392939 ||  || — || February 16, 2010 || Mount Lemmon || Mount Lemmon Survey || — || align=right | 1.1 km || 
|-id=940 bgcolor=#fefefe
| 392940 ||  || — || October 24, 2005 || Kitt Peak || Spacewatch || NYS || align=right data-sort-value="0.72" | 720 m || 
|-id=941 bgcolor=#E9E9E9
| 392941 ||  || — || January 20, 2009 || Catalina || CSS || — || align=right | 2.0 km || 
|-id=942 bgcolor=#E9E9E9
| 392942 ||  || — || September 13, 2007 || Mount Lemmon || Mount Lemmon Survey || HEN || align=right | 1.1 km || 
|-id=943 bgcolor=#E9E9E9
| 392943 ||  || — || October 29, 2008 || Kitt Peak || Spacewatch || — || align=right | 3.8 km || 
|-id=944 bgcolor=#d6d6d6
| 392944 ||  || — || November 14, 2007 || Kitt Peak || Spacewatch || KOR || align=right | 1.5 km || 
|-id=945 bgcolor=#E9E9E9
| 392945 ||  || — || December 21, 2008 || Socorro || LINEAR || — || align=right | 1.6 km || 
|-id=946 bgcolor=#fefefe
| 392946 ||  || — || April 22, 2004 || Kitt Peak || Spacewatch || — || align=right data-sort-value="0.74" | 740 m || 
|-id=947 bgcolor=#E9E9E9
| 392947 ||  || — || September 28, 2003 || Kitt Peak || Spacewatch || — || align=right | 1.1 km || 
|-id=948 bgcolor=#d6d6d6
| 392948 ||  || — || August 28, 2006 || Kitt Peak || Spacewatch || — || align=right | 2.0 km || 
|-id=949 bgcolor=#E9E9E9
| 392949 ||  || — || December 19, 2004 || Mount Lemmon || Mount Lemmon Survey || — || align=right | 1.3 km || 
|-id=950 bgcolor=#E9E9E9
| 392950 ||  || — || February 2, 2005 || Kitt Peak || Spacewatch || — || align=right | 1.5 km || 
|-id=951 bgcolor=#E9E9E9
| 392951 ||  || — || October 1, 2003 || Anderson Mesa || LONEOS || HNS || align=right | 1.7 km || 
|-id=952 bgcolor=#d6d6d6
| 392952 ||  || — || March 18, 2009 || Catalina || CSS || — || align=right | 3.1 km || 
|-id=953 bgcolor=#E9E9E9
| 392953 ||  || — || October 12, 2007 || Catalina || CSS || PAD || align=right | 1.6 km || 
|-id=954 bgcolor=#fefefe
| 392954 ||  || — || December 12, 1998 || Kitt Peak || Spacewatch || — || align=right data-sort-value="0.90" | 900 m || 
|-id=955 bgcolor=#E9E9E9
| 392955 ||  || — || November 29, 2003 || Kitt Peak || Spacewatch || HOF || align=right | 2.6 km || 
|-id=956 bgcolor=#E9E9E9
| 392956 ||  || — || September 9, 2007 || Kitt Peak || Spacewatch || NEM || align=right | 2.2 km || 
|-id=957 bgcolor=#E9E9E9
| 392957 ||  || — || May 8, 2006 || Mount Lemmon || Mount Lemmon Survey || HNS || align=right | 1.3 km || 
|-id=958 bgcolor=#fefefe
| 392958 ||  || — || December 13, 2006 || Kitt Peak || Spacewatch || — || align=right data-sort-value="0.79" | 790 m || 
|-id=959 bgcolor=#fefefe
| 392959 ||  || — || August 21, 2004 || Siding Spring || SSS || — || align=right | 1.1 km || 
|-id=960 bgcolor=#fefefe
| 392960 ||  || — || October 23, 1997 || Kitt Peak || Spacewatch || — || align=right data-sort-value="0.87" | 870 m || 
|-id=961 bgcolor=#d6d6d6
| 392961 ||  || — || November 8, 2007 || Mount Lemmon || Mount Lemmon Survey || — || align=right | 3.7 km || 
|-id=962 bgcolor=#d6d6d6
| 392962 ||  || — || May 11, 2010 || Mount Lemmon || Mount Lemmon Survey || EOS || align=right | 2.2 km || 
|-id=963 bgcolor=#E9E9E9
| 392963 ||  || — || February 24, 2006 || Kitt Peak || Spacewatch || — || align=right | 1.2 km || 
|-id=964 bgcolor=#E9E9E9
| 392964 ||  || — || May 22, 2010 || Siding Spring || SSS || GER || align=right | 2.1 km || 
|-id=965 bgcolor=#E9E9E9
| 392965 ||  || — || December 15, 2004 || Socorro || LINEAR || — || align=right | 1.5 km || 
|-id=966 bgcolor=#fefefe
| 392966 ||  || — || September 28, 2008 || Catalina || CSS || V || align=right data-sort-value="0.62" | 620 m || 
|-id=967 bgcolor=#fefefe
| 392967 ||  || — || March 15, 2007 || Mount Lemmon || Mount Lemmon Survey || V || align=right data-sort-value="0.61" | 610 m || 
|-id=968 bgcolor=#E9E9E9
| 392968 ||  || — || December 4, 2008 || Kitt Peak || Spacewatch || — || align=right data-sort-value="0.95" | 950 m || 
|-id=969 bgcolor=#E9E9E9
| 392969 ||  || — || March 10, 2005 || Mount Lemmon || Mount Lemmon Survey || AST || align=right | 1.8 km || 
|-id=970 bgcolor=#E9E9E9
| 392970 ||  || — || April 9, 2010 || Kitt Peak || Spacewatch || — || align=right | 2.2 km || 
|-id=971 bgcolor=#fefefe
| 392971 ||  || — || October 8, 2008 || Mount Lemmon || Mount Lemmon Survey || V || align=right data-sort-value="0.81" | 810 m || 
|-id=972 bgcolor=#d6d6d6
| 392972 ||  || — || February 23, 2003 || Kitt Peak || Spacewatch || — || align=right | 2.3 km || 
|-id=973 bgcolor=#d6d6d6
| 392973 ||  || — || December 19, 2007 || Mount Lemmon || Mount Lemmon Survey || LIX || align=right | 4.1 km || 
|-id=974 bgcolor=#E9E9E9
| 392974 ||  || — || October 10, 2007 || Mount Lemmon || Mount Lemmon Survey || — || align=right | 1.7 km || 
|-id=975 bgcolor=#E9E9E9
| 392975 ||  || — || January 6, 2005 || Catalina || CSS || EUN || align=right | 1.3 km || 
|-id=976 bgcolor=#d6d6d6
| 392976 ||  || — || January 1, 2003 || Kitt Peak || Spacewatch || — || align=right | 3.7 km || 
|-id=977 bgcolor=#d6d6d6
| 392977 ||  || — || June 12, 2004 || Kitt Peak || Spacewatch || EUP || align=right | 5.1 km || 
|-id=978 bgcolor=#E9E9E9
| 392978 ||  || — || October 10, 2007 || Mount Lemmon || Mount Lemmon Survey || — || align=right | 2.7 km || 
|-id=979 bgcolor=#E9E9E9
| 392979 ||  || — || January 15, 2010 || WISE || WISE || — || align=right | 3.0 km || 
|-id=980 bgcolor=#d6d6d6
| 392980 ||  || — || March 15, 2008 || Kitt Peak || Spacewatch || HYG || align=right | 2.6 km || 
|-id=981 bgcolor=#E9E9E9
| 392981 ||  || — || January 1, 2009 || Mount Lemmon || Mount Lemmon Survey || — || align=right | 2.9 km || 
|-id=982 bgcolor=#E9E9E9
| 392982 ||  || — || December 29, 2008 || Mount Lemmon || Mount Lemmon Survey || HOF || align=right | 2.2 km || 
|-id=983 bgcolor=#E9E9E9
| 392983 ||  || — || December 19, 2004 || Anderson Mesa || LONEOS || EUN || align=right | 1.9 km || 
|-id=984 bgcolor=#fefefe
| 392984 ||  || — || November 10, 2001 || Socorro || LINEAR || — || align=right data-sort-value="0.94" | 940 m || 
|-id=985 bgcolor=#d6d6d6
| 392985 ||  || — || January 31, 2009 || Mount Lemmon || Mount Lemmon Survey || 628 || align=right | 1.4 km || 
|-id=986 bgcolor=#d6d6d6
| 392986 ||  || — || January 16, 2008 || Mount Lemmon || Mount Lemmon Survey || 7:4* || align=right | 3.3 km || 
|-id=987 bgcolor=#d6d6d6
| 392987 ||  || — || February 14, 2004 || Kitt Peak || Spacewatch || — || align=right | 2.2 km || 
|-id=988 bgcolor=#E9E9E9
| 392988 ||  || — || November 8, 2008 || Mount Lemmon || Mount Lemmon Survey || — || align=right | 2.5 km || 
|-id=989 bgcolor=#fefefe
| 392989 ||  || — || October 26, 2005 || Kitt Peak || Spacewatch || V || align=right data-sort-value="0.74" | 740 m || 
|-id=990 bgcolor=#d6d6d6
| 392990 ||  || — || November 13, 2006 || Catalina || CSS || — || align=right | 3.6 km || 
|-id=991 bgcolor=#d6d6d6
| 392991 ||  || — || November 18, 2007 || Mount Lemmon || Mount Lemmon Survey || KOR || align=right | 1.4 km || 
|-id=992 bgcolor=#fefefe
| 392992 ||  || — || December 8, 2005 || Kitt Peak || Spacewatch || — || align=right data-sort-value="0.86" | 860 m || 
|-id=993 bgcolor=#E9E9E9
| 392993 ||  || — || October 6, 1999 || Socorro || LINEAR || — || align=right | 1.2 km || 
|-id=994 bgcolor=#d6d6d6
| 392994 ||  || — || November 17, 2006 || Mount Lemmon || Mount Lemmon Survey || — || align=right | 3.2 km || 
|-id=995 bgcolor=#E9E9E9
| 392995 ||  || — || September 9, 2007 || Kitt Peak || Spacewatch || PAD || align=right | 1.5 km || 
|-id=996 bgcolor=#d6d6d6
| 392996 ||  || — || December 19, 2007 || Mount Lemmon || Mount Lemmon Survey || — || align=right | 3.3 km || 
|-id=997 bgcolor=#d6d6d6
| 392997 ||  || — || November 25, 2006 || Kitt Peak || Spacewatch || — || align=right | 3.6 km || 
|-id=998 bgcolor=#E9E9E9
| 392998 ||  || — || December 18, 2003 || Kitt Peak || Spacewatch || — || align=right | 3.2 km || 
|-id=999 bgcolor=#d6d6d6
| 392999 ||  || — || December 2, 1996 || Kitt Peak || Spacewatch || EOS || align=right | 2.2 km || 
|-id=000 bgcolor=#E9E9E9
| 393000 ||  || — || September 18, 2003 || Socorro || LINEAR || — || align=right | 1.2 km || 
|}

References

External links 
 Discovery Circumstances: Numbered Minor Planets (390001)–(395000) (IAU Minor Planet Center)

0392